= Rainworth State School =

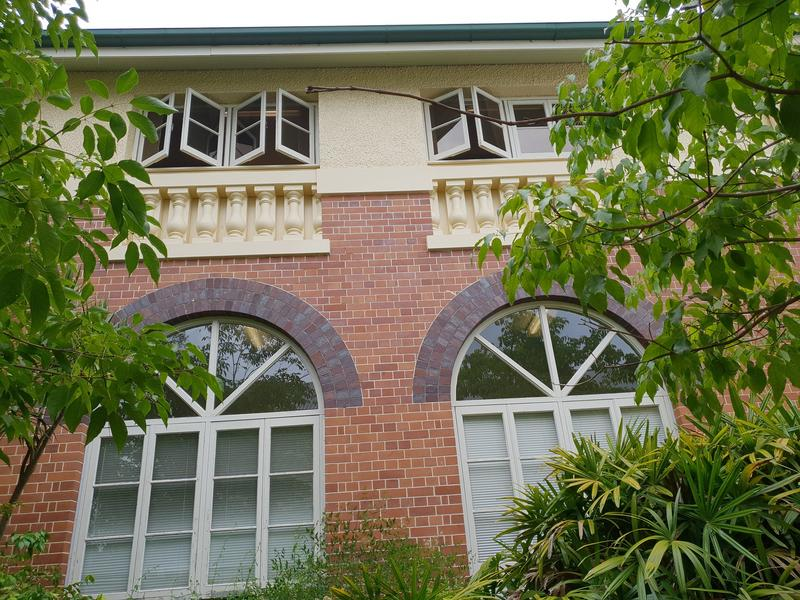
- Block C, north elevation, Rainworth State School, 2018

- Location within Queensland
- 27.4678°S 152.9848°E
- Location: 185 Boundary Road, Bardon, City of Brisbane, Queensland, Australia

History
- Design period: 1919–1930s (Interwar period)
- Built: 1929–1930, 1929–1930, 1932–1933, 1934

Queensland Heritage Register
- Official name: Rainworth State School
- Type: state heritage
- Designated: 21 August 2019
- Reference no.: 650234
- Type: Education, Research, Scientific Facility: School – state (primary)
- Theme: Educating Queenslanders: Providing primary schooling

Rainworth State School is a heritage-listed state school at 185 Boundary Road, Bardon, City of Brisbane, Queensland, Australia. It was built from 1929 to 1930. It was added to the Queensland Heritage Register on 21 August 2019.

== History ==
Rainworth State School, which opened in July 1928, is located in the residential suburb of Bardon, approximately 4.2 km west of Brisbane's central business district. The school demonstrates the evolution of state education and its associated architecture. It retains the first stage of a Depression-era brick school building (1934) and a retaining wall with stairs (1933), set in landscaped grounds with play areas and sporting facilities. The school has a strong and ongoing association with the past and present community of Rainworth (a neighbourhood within the suburb of Bardon) and its surrounding suburbs.

The school site is located within the traditional lands of the Turrbal people. Originally called Upper Paddington, Bardon was surveyed in 1862, sold as country lots in the same year, and became gentlemen's estates and farms. The future school site was purchased by Brisbane merchant, George Harris, in 1862 as part of an almost 54-acre (21.9ha) landholding. Residential subdivision of the Bardon area began during the 1880s, but progressed slowly until after World War I. The Rainworth Estate, part of Sir Augustus Charles Gregory's former "Rainworth" property, from which the locality of Rainworth derives its name, was subdivided and quickly sold in 1925.

With residential development came the need for a school. The Department of Public Instruction purchased two adjacent, elevated, well-drained allotments, comprising seven acres and 33 perches (2.868ha), for a school site in December 1925, at a cost of £1008 17s 6d. In July 1926, it was agreed that a school would be established. Prior to the school's opening, local residents began clearing the school grounds.

Rainworth State School opened on 2 July 1928, with 253 students and five teachers. The new school was intended to relieve overcrowding at schools in surrounding areas and to serve the Rainworth, Rosehill and Soudan suburban estates, and parts of Birdwood Terrace, Upper Paddington, and Bardon. It comprised two high-set timber sectional buildings (now called Blocks A and B) connected by a northern verandah. The buildings, of the most commonly constructed standard type at this time, comprised eight classrooms, each accommodating 40 students. The building cost about £5374. By December 1928, 317 children were enrolled.

Easier access to the school for pupils and those attending functions, resulted from the opening of an extension of the tram line from Rosalie to the Rainworth Estate on 11 October 1930, terminating on Boundary Road near the western boundary of the school. Enrolments at Rainworth State School reached 415 pupils in October 1931.

The Great Depression, commencing in 1929 and extending well into the 1930s, caused a dramatic reduction of public building work in Queensland and brought private building work to a standstill. In response, the Queensland Government provided relief work for unemployed Queenslanders, and also embarked on an ambitious and important building program to provide impetus to the economy.

Even before the October 1929 stock market crash, the Queensland Government initiated an Unemployment Relief Scheme, through a work program administered by the Department of Public Works (DPW). This included painting and repairs to school buildings. Extensive funding was given for improvements to school grounds, including fencing and levelling ground for play areas, involving terracing and retaining walls. This work created many large school playing fields, which, prior to this period, were mostly cleared of trees but not landscaped. These play areas became a standard inclusion within Queensland state schools and a characteristic element. Under this scheme, men were undertaking grounds improvement works to 20 schools in the metropolitan area, including Rainworth State School, in the 1929–30 financial year.

In June 1932, the Forgan Smith Labor Government came to power from a campaign advocating increased government spending to counter the effects of the Depression. The government embarked on a large public building program designed to promote the employment of local skilled workers, the purchase of local building materials and the production of commodious, low maintenance buildings which would be a long-term asset to the state. The construction of substantial brick school buildings in prosperous or growing suburban areas and regional centres during the 1930s provided tangible proof of the government's commitment to remedy the unemployment situation.

Depression-era brick school buildings form a recognisable and important type of Queensland school architecture, exhibiting many common characteristics. Most were designed in a classical idiom to project the sense of stability and optimism which the government sought to convey through the architecture of its public buildings. Frequently, they were two storeys above an open undercroft and built to accommodate up to 1000 students. They adopted a symmetrical plan form and often exhibited a prominent central entry. The plan arrangement was similar to that of timber buildings, being only one classroom deep, accessed by a long straight verandah or corridor. Classrooms were commonly divided by folding timber partitions and the undercroft was used as covered play space, storage, ablutions and other functions. Due to their long plan forms of multiple wings, these buildings could be built in stages, as available funding permitted and student numbers required; resulting in some complete designs never being realised. This was the case at Rainworth State School.

Despite their similarities, each Depression-era brick school building was individually designed by a DPW architect, which resulted in a wide range of styles and ornamental features being utilised within the overall set. These styles, which were derived from contemporary tastes and fashions, included: Arts and Crafts, typified by half-timbered gable-ends; Spanish Mission, with round-arched openings and decorative parapets; and Neo-classical, with pilasters, columns and large triangular pediments. Over time, variations occurred in building size, decorative treatment, and climatic-responsive features. The Chief Architect during this period was Andrew Baxter Leven (1885–1966), who was employed by the Queensland Government Works Department from 1910 to 1951, and was Chief Architect and Quantity Surveyor from 1933 to 1951. The DPW architects involved in the design of Rainworth State School were Raymond Clare Nowland and Harold James Parr.

The Department of Public Instruction and the DPW approved a brick school building scheme for Rainworth State School, in the expectation of growing pupil numbers in this developing suburban area. In March and April 1933, plans were drawn for two substantial brick buildings to replace Rainworth State School's existing timber ones. The centre line of the new building scheme was aligned with the existing steps from Boundary Street. The plan of the two buildings and the aesthetic treatment of the rear building to the south, which was to be constructed first, were similar to Coorparoo State School's brick building scheme, designed in 1927 and implemented between 1928 and 1942. The Rainworth State School scheme was to be built in stages until ultimately containing 40 classrooms and accommodating 1,200 pupils.

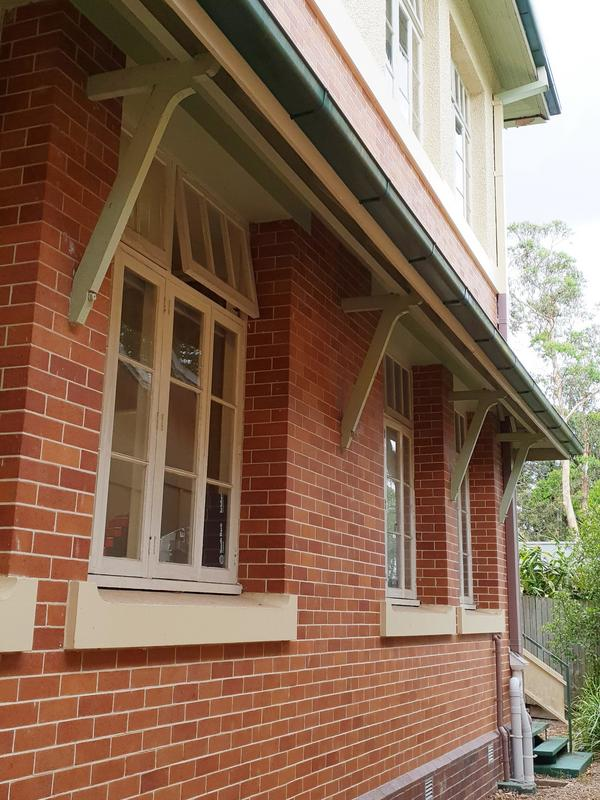
Block C, south elevation, 2018

Stage One of the school scheme (the eastern section of the rear building) was a two-storey brick building (now called Block C). Its construction was completed during the 1933–34 financial year. The building was of fire-proof construction with external walls of facebrick and roughcast render, surmounted by a galvanised iron roof. It comprised two classrooms for 40 pupils each on both floors, providing accommodation for 160 pupils, plus a stair hall at the western end, accessed by north and south-facing entrances with porticos and short stairs. It had north-facing verandahs on both levels with arched openings at the ground floor and decorative concrete first floor balusters. Intended to be extended to the west, it included exposed keyed brickwork to facilitate future building.

Rainworth State School's enrolments failed to achieve the growth expected by the Department of Public Instruction. Students often transferred to Milton State School, which had a swimming pool and offered vocational training from c. 1937, or to the Central Practising School in Spring Hill, which had a reputation for preparing students for scholarship examinations. The opening of the Petrie Terrace Opportunity Class in 1933, and St Joseph's Primary School in Bardon in 1938, also affected enrolments.

Consequently, only Stage One was constructed. This non-completion of the building scheme was not uncommon among the public buildings in Queensland designed to be constructed in stages. Some examples are the University of Queensland Mayne Medical School; the Townsville State Government Offices; and the Depression-era brick school buildings at Ipswich North State School and at Newmarket State School.

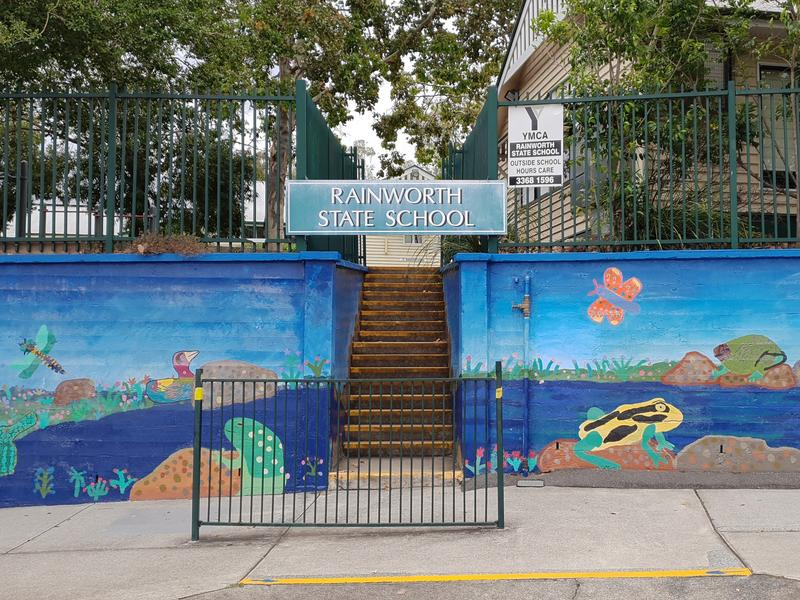
Retaining wall and entrance steps, 2018

An important component of Queensland state schools was their grounds. The early and continuing commitment to play-based education, particularly in primary school, resulted in the provision of outdoor play space and sporting facilities, such as playing fields and tennis courts. The Rainworth State School site was originally rough and hilly, with a creek running through the low-lying area at the southern end of the site. A level, open space to the north of Block A was utilised as a parade ground from the school's opening day. Between 1928 and 1935, the school was fenced; steps were dug into the steep embankment behind the school buildings; and tennis courts, and a sporting field were levelled and laid out. The DPW provided a concrete cricket pitch, and concreting underneath the timber school buildings was completed. Tree stumps were removed using explosives during a working bee c. 1929. Relief workers cleared and levelled the playing field and excavated the site for the grass tennis courts during the 1929–30 financial year. A concrete retaining wall and steps to Boundary Road and along the northern part of the eastern boundary, were constructed by the DPW using day labour, between July and September 1932. A 100-foot-long (30.5m) section of the wall collapsed in September 1932 after heavy rain, and was rebuilt in 1933.

The commencement of the Pacific theatre of World War II (WWII) in December 1941, with its threat of invasion of Australia, resulted in the Queensland Government closing all coastal state schools in January 1942. Most schools, including Rainworth State School, reopened on 2 March 1942, but student attendance was optional until the war ended. Air-raid trenches were dug at the school by parents and friends for the pupils.

Typically, schools were a focus for civilian duty during wartime. At many schools, students and staff members grew produce and flowers for donation to local hospitals and organised fundraising and the donation of useful items to Australian soldiers on active service. At Rainworth State School in 1942, girls in Grade 5 organised a benefit concert and raised £1 for the Smokes for Soldiers' Appeal. A concert was also held at the school to raise money for the mercantile marine. Proceeds from the Bardon-Rainworth Horse Show and Carnival, held in the school grounds, went to the Battle Stations Appeal.

Following WWII, the Department of Public Instruction was largely unprepared for the enormous demand for state education between the late 1940s and the 1960s. This was a nation-wide occurrence resulting from immigration and the unprecedented population growth now termed the "baby boom". Queensland schools were overcrowded and, to cope, many new buildings were constructed and existing buildings were extended. At Rainworth State School, enrolments increased, but not to the extent experienced at other schools, and it was not until the late 1950s that enrolments exceeded 300 students, equalling the November 1938 level.

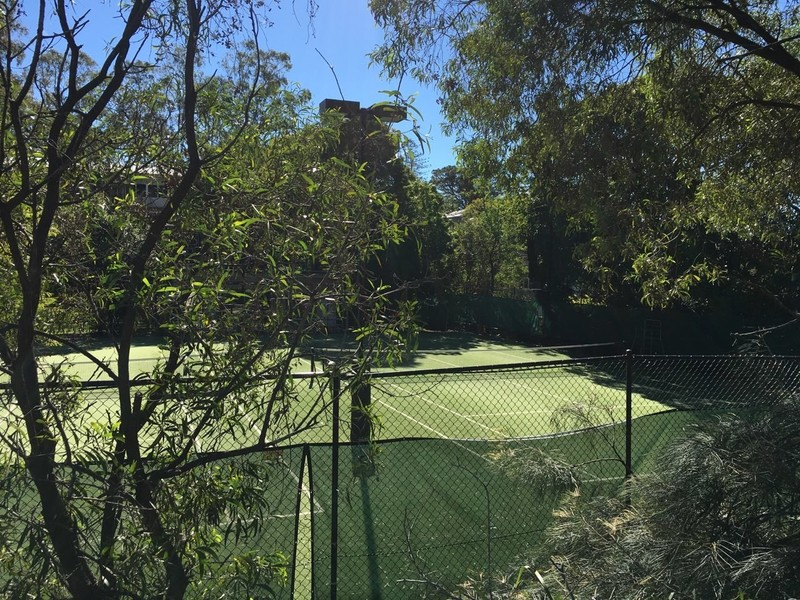
Tennis courts, looking northeast, 2019

Further grounds improvements were made at Rainworth State School after WWII. The tennis courts were repaired and top-dressed in 1949. In 1952, parents filled in the air-raid trenches. Shelter sheds at the tennis courts were constructed and more swings and garden seats were added to the site in 1954. The parade ground fronting Boundary Road was bituminised in 1957. In 1958, the Parents and Citizens Association (P&C), arranged for the Post Master General's Office (PMG) to use its bulldozers and graders, to widen and lengthen the school oval, fill-in a creek, put in a supporting/retaining wall, do groundwork for a basketball area and built an access road from the school to the playing field. In 1963, the tennis courts were given a new grass surface, drainage was repaired and a new umpire stand erected. In 1964, stairs to the playing field were constructed. In 1981, an Arbor Day celebration resulted in 500 trees being planted in the school grounds but many did not survive; while a Brisbane City Council grant funded a major upgrade of the tennis courts, which were sealed, extended by 2.4m, re-fenced and their drainage improved. Further upgrading of the tennis courts with synthetic grass, improved drainage and re-fencing occurred in 2000. A mural was painted on the Boundary Street retaining wall in the 1980s, and was renewed in 1999.

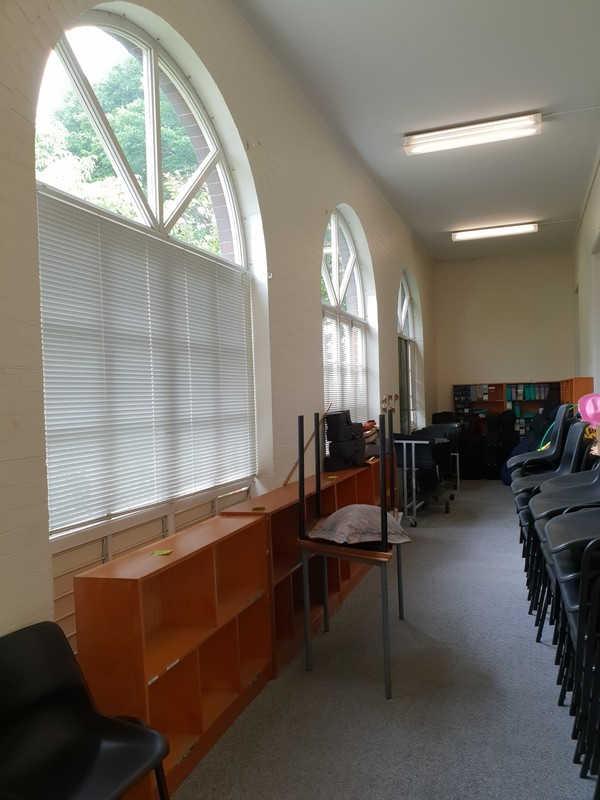
Block C, enclosed ground floor verandah, 2018

Alterations to Block C took place in 1984. These changes included enclosing the building's north verandahs by: inserting new timber-framed windows; demolishing the brick ground floor spandrel panels and replacing them with metal louvres; sealing behind the first floor concrete balusters; and adding a concrete screed on the verandah floors to raise them to match the internal floor level. The keyed brickwork on the west elevation, where planned extensions were to connect, was removed, plastered and painted over. To accommodate a school library on the ground floor, a suspended ceiling was inserted and partitions were added in the east classroom to form a workroom and store. On the first floor, the two classrooms were converted into a double teaching area by making a large opening in the partition and introducing an accordion door. Concrete block partitions were added to the first floor stair landing to make a storeroom.

Other buildings have been added to the Rainworth State School site and existing buildings have been modified over the life time of the school. In 1981, due to low enrolments, the Rainworth and Bardon State Preschools were combined, at Rainworth State School, resulting in Rainworth Preschool operating on a full-time basis, in a pre-school centre (Block P) built on the southern boundary between 1978 and 1980. In 1983, Block D, a two-storey building, was constructed to the west of Block C. Blocks A and B were extensively modified in 1984 with internal and verandah walls removed, the verandah enclosed using glass louvres, and a sports room and a janitor's workshop built underneath. In 1986, Block D was extended and a demountable classroom building (Block E) placed on-site. In 1987, a new toilet block and store (Block I) was added to the site. The multipurpose building/OSHC was added north of the parade ground in 1998 and two more demountable buildings were added in 2001. A teaching building (Block N) was constructed in 2014. Prep Buildings (Blocks Q and R) were erected between 2004 and 2010. The former parade ground was resurfaced as play space between 2008 and 2018. Blocks K (library and offices) and L (hall) were constructed in 2010. In 2013, Blocks H and J (2001) were removed and the parade ground changed from bitumen to synthetic turf.

Throughout its history, Rainworth State School has been the focus and site of community events. The school provided a venue for the local community - sporting, religious, political, and leisure groups - with "grounds to play on, rooms to meet in, secure places for storage, equipment for hire and facilities for important community functions". In return, the community supported the school through donations. Fund-raising for improvements began with the school's opening when a fete and a dance were held on site. Fancy dress dances and fetes held at the school from 1928 also raised funds. An early fund-raising purpose was sporting facilities. Milestones in the school's history, including 25th, 50th, 60th, 70th and 75th anniversaries, have been celebrated with commemorative events, souvenirs and a published school history.

In 2019, Rainworth State School continues to operate from its original site and has an enrolment of almost 600 pupils. It retains Stage One of a Depression-era brick school building and a Depression-era concrete retaining wall with stairs; set in landscaped grounds with play areas and sporting facilities. The school remains important to Rainworth and surrounding areas, as a key social focus for the community.

== Description ==
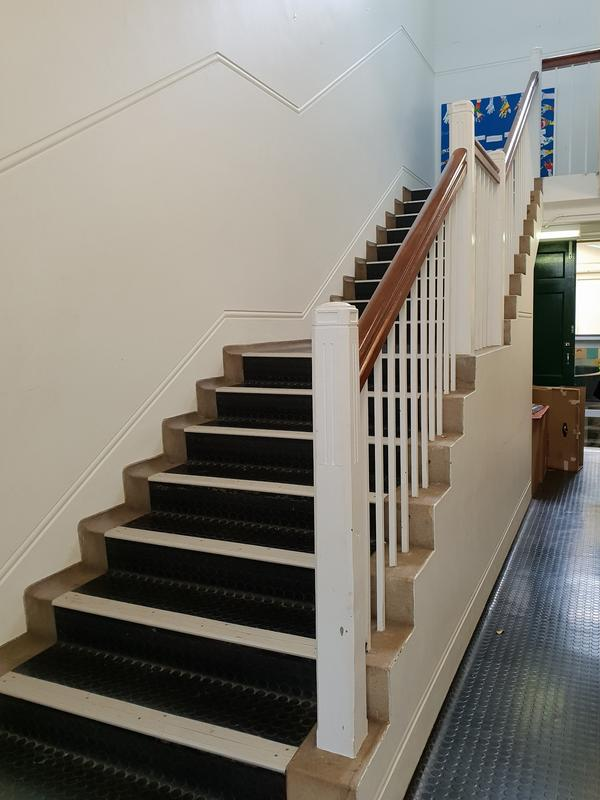
Block C, internal staircase, 2018

Rainworth State School occupies a 2.868ha site in Bardon, a suburb approximately 4.2 km west of the Brisbane CBD. The school fronts Boundary Road to the north and is bounded on its other sides by Main Avenue (south) and residential properties (east and west). The complex of teaching buildings stands on the north-eastern corner of the site, with a large playing field occupying the western half and tennis courts at the south-eastern corner.

=== Block C (1934): Depression-era brick school building ===
Block C is a two-storey, brick teaching building that comprises only a small (east) end portion of an unfinished larger building. Surrounded by other nearby teaching buildings, its long sides face north (front) and south with a north-facing verandahs (now enclosed to form corridors). Entrances with porticos, are on the building's north and south sides at the west end and provide access into a stair hall. The ground and first floors have similar layouts, accommodating two classrooms each, accessed from the corridor.

=== Retaining Wall (1933) ===
Depression-era concrete retaining wall with concrete entrance stair runs along the north boundary of the site with Boundary Road. The wall is approximately 100m in length, beginning at the edge of the school driveway to the west and returning along the north east corner of the site.

=== Playing Field (1929–30) ===
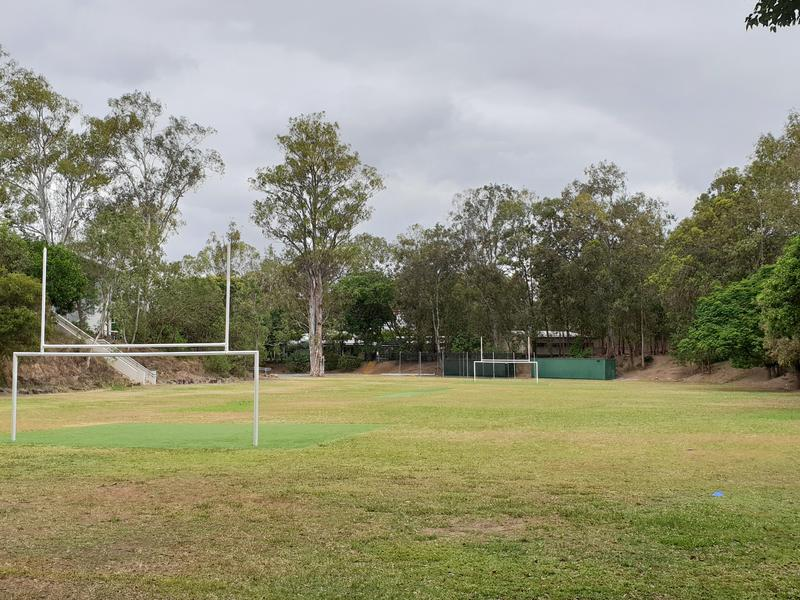
Playing field, looking south, 2018

A large playing field occupies the western half of the school site.

=== Tennis Courts (1929–30) ===
Two adjacent tennis courts are located in the southeast corner of the site.

== Heritage listing ==
Rainworth State School was listed on the Queensland Heritage Register on 21 August 2019 having satisfied the following criteria.

The place is important in demonstrating the evolution or pattern of Queensland's history.

Rainworth State School (established in 1928) is important in demonstrating the evolution of state education and its associated architecture in Queensland. The place retains a distinctive example of a government-designed Depression-era brick school building (1934) that was an architectural response to prevailing government educational philosophies; set in landscaped grounds with a concrete retaining wall with stairs (1933), play areas, and sporting facilities.

The Depression-era brick school building, retaining wall with stairs, and the levelling of parts of the school grounds for a playing field (1929–30) and tennis courts (1929–30) are the result of the Queensland Government's building and relief work programmes during the 1930s that stimulated the economy and provided work for men unemployed as a result of the Great Depression. As the first stage of a larger scheme (ultimately unrealised), the building demonstrates the Department of Public Works' policy of staged construction of Depression-era brick school buildings, to accommodate growth in pupil numbers, as funding became available.

The landscaped suburban site with provision of play and sporting facilities, demonstrates the importance of play and aesthetics in the education of children.

The place is important in demonstrating the principal characteristics of a particular class of cultural places.

Rainworth State School is important in demonstrating the principal characteristics of a Queensland state school of the Depression-era. These include: a government-designed Depression-era brick school building with two-storey form, high-quality design with ornamental features, and facebrick exterior, set within a 1930s landscaped site with a retaining wall and stairs, play areas, and sporting facilities.

The place has a strong or special association with a particular community or cultural group for social, cultural or spiritual reasons.

Rainworth State School has a strong and ongoing association with past and present pupils, parents, staff members, and the surrounding community through sustained use since its establishment in a rapidly developing residential area in 1928. The place is important for its contribution to the educational development of Rainworth and its surrounding suburbs within Queensland's capital as they evolved over more than 90 years, with generations of children taught at the school. Since its inception, it has served as a prominent venue for social interaction and community focus. The strength of association is demonstrated through repeated local volunteer action, donations, and an active Parents and Citizens Association.
