= Walter Hume =

Walter Hume may refer to:

- Walter Cunningham Hume (1839–1921), British surveyor
- Walter Hume (industrialist) (1873–1943), Australian inventor and industrialist
- Walter Hume, Registrar General of Hong Kong 1968–1976
