= Walter Cunningham Hume =

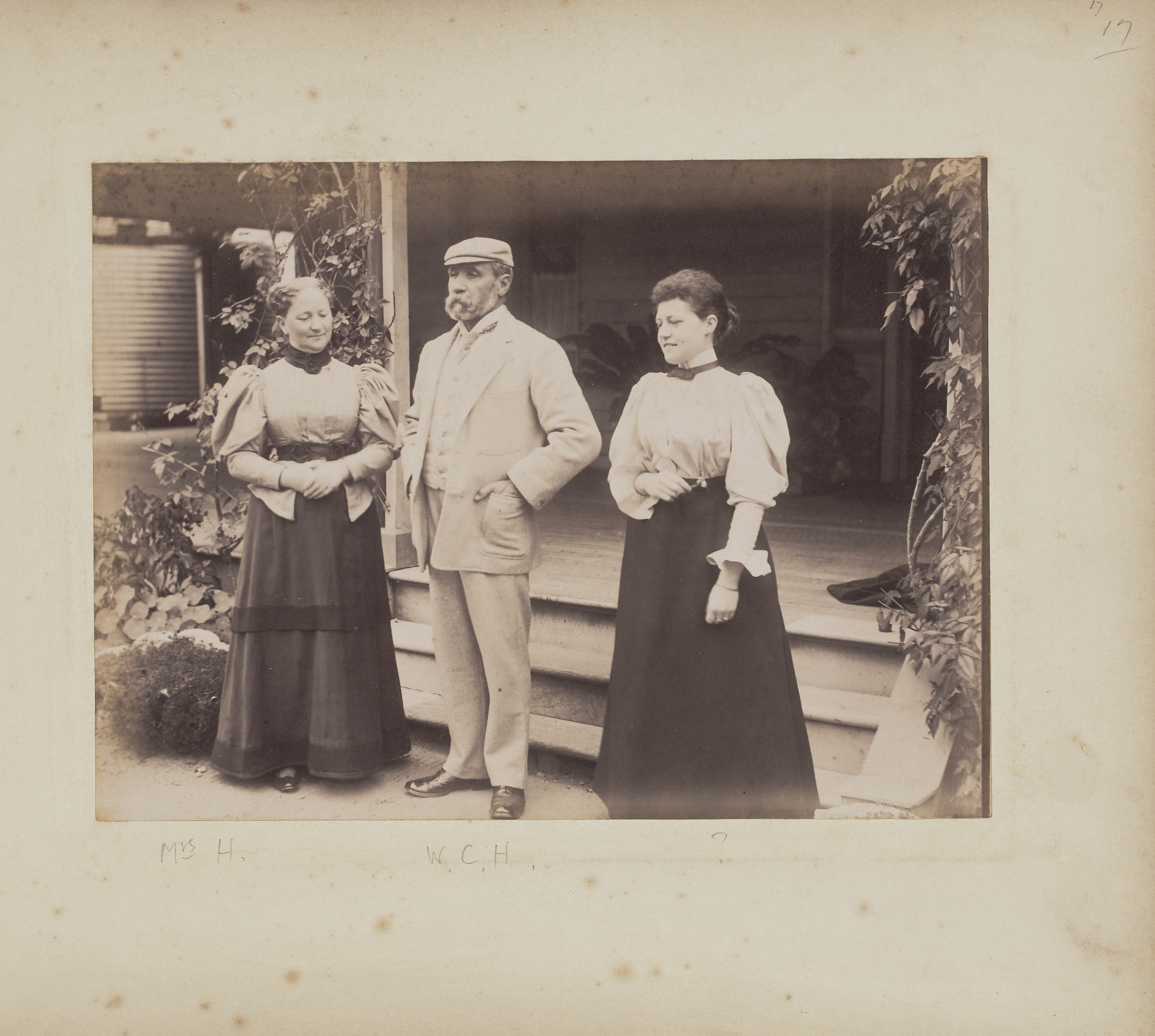
Walter C. Hume (middle), his wife, Katie (left) and an unidentified woman at their home Fairseat in Brisbane c.1890, Hume Family Collection, UQFL10, Album 6, Page 17, Fryer Library, The University of Queensland Library

Walter Cunningham Hume (1839–1921) was a British surveyor who emigrated to Australia to provide for his family. He spent almost 40 years surveying the Darling Downs region of Queensland, helping to develop land policy. He was an active photographer whose work reflected life in Australia pre-Federation.

== Early life ==
Walter Cunningham Hume was born 31 January 1839, in Hampshire, the eldest of six children of Alexander Hume, a Scottish poet and lyricist and his wife Elizabeth Scott. His father worked as a brewer's agent in between writing and travelled twice to the US either to meet American writer Ralph Waldo Emerson or to seek a more favourable climate. He returned to England and died in Northampton 1851. Walter Hume's mother established a school and the young Walter took lessons with her until he joined the P&O Line as a midshipman. He probably met his future wife, Katie Fowler and her sisters at his mother's boarding school and he visited the Fowler family between 1860 and 1862 at their home in Buckinghamshire.

== Career and emigration to Australia ==
Hume rose from midshipman to Officer Second Class in the mercantile marine, taking his master's licence. He left his position in the P&O line in 1862, in order to advance his career and provide extra surety for the support of his family in England. He met Francis Thomas Gregory on one of his voyages. Gregory's brother, Augustus Gregory was Surveyor General and Commissioner for Lands in the colony of Queensland, and Hume decided to pursue a surveying career under Gregory arriving in 1863. He took a loan and apprenticed to Francis Gregory for 18 months in St George, Queensland before being granted a Surveyor Second Class position in the Surveyor General's Department in 1864. He was granted his own “Camp” and given the role of setting up towns and agricultural centres in the Darling Downs district, west of Brisbane. His mother, three of his sisters and a brother emigrated to Australia ahead of him. His sister, Marion married Francis Gregory, while his mother married a merchant and commission agent and sister Jenny Hume married a Toowoomba bank manager. His advancement in the Surveyor-General's Department enabled him to propose marriage to Katie Fowler in 1864.

Hume married Anna Kate “Katie” Fowler in Brisbane, Australia in 1866, after she arrived in Australia. Her father had been an architect and commissioner of the 1851 Great Exhibition. They lived in Drayton near Toowoomba. Hume was retrenched in 1867 but took up private surveying work the following year. They had eight children, five dying in early infancy. The family prospered as Hume was appointed Mineral Lands Commissioner in Stanthorpe in 1872. He undertook a geological survey of the area and the family split their time between Stanthorpe and Drayton. Hume was appointed Commissioner of Crown Lands, Darling Downs District in 1875. He signed off on the establishment of the town of Texas on the Queensland and New South Wales state border. In 1876 the Humes moved to a new home “The Hermitage” outside of Toowoomba.

In 1877 Hume became a member of the Queensland Club, putting him amongst the state's most distinguished businessmen and government circle. He was volunteer in the Queensland Marine Defence Force, enabling him to practise his mariner's skills. After a year long sabbatical in England in 1883, the Humes returned to Toowoomba and built a home they called "Fairseat". Hume was appointed the Under Secretary to the Department of Lands in 1884. They moved to Brisbane and resided in Torwood, in a home made available to them by Augustus Gregory on his Rainworth estate. They named this home “Fairseat” in tribute to their previous home in Toowoomba and lived there for the next 15 years.

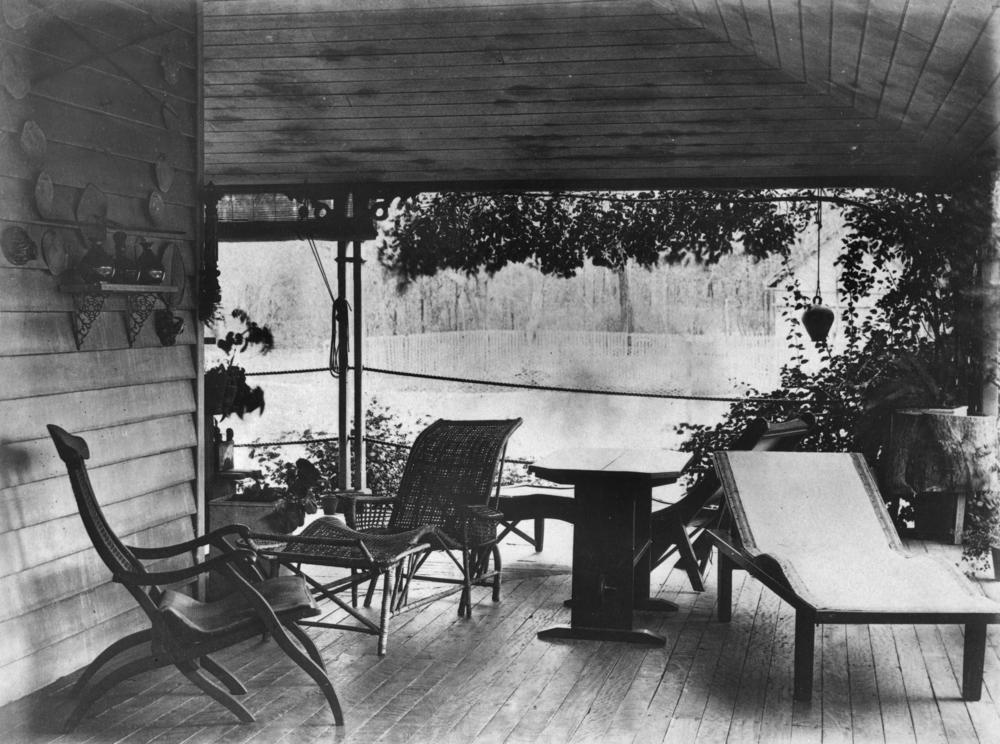
Verandah at 'Fairseat', the residence of W.C. Hume at Torwood, Brisbane, 1890 (8759895757)

In 1898, Hume became a judge of the Queensland Land Court. He retired from civil service in 1901 and the family elected to return to England. They returned to Australia to visit in 1907.

== Legacy ==
Walter Hume died in Jersey in 1921 and was survived by his children, his wife pre-deceasing him in 1909. His 38 years of service as a surveyor as well as his contribution to Queensland's land policy and administration was remarked upon in Queensland newspapers. The family's diaries, photographs and letters, which record the growth of the state of Queensland, architecture, the 1893 floods and the social life of this era are held in the Fryer Library of the University of Queensland. The street of Hume in Rainworth, Brisbane is named for him.
