= Bardon House =

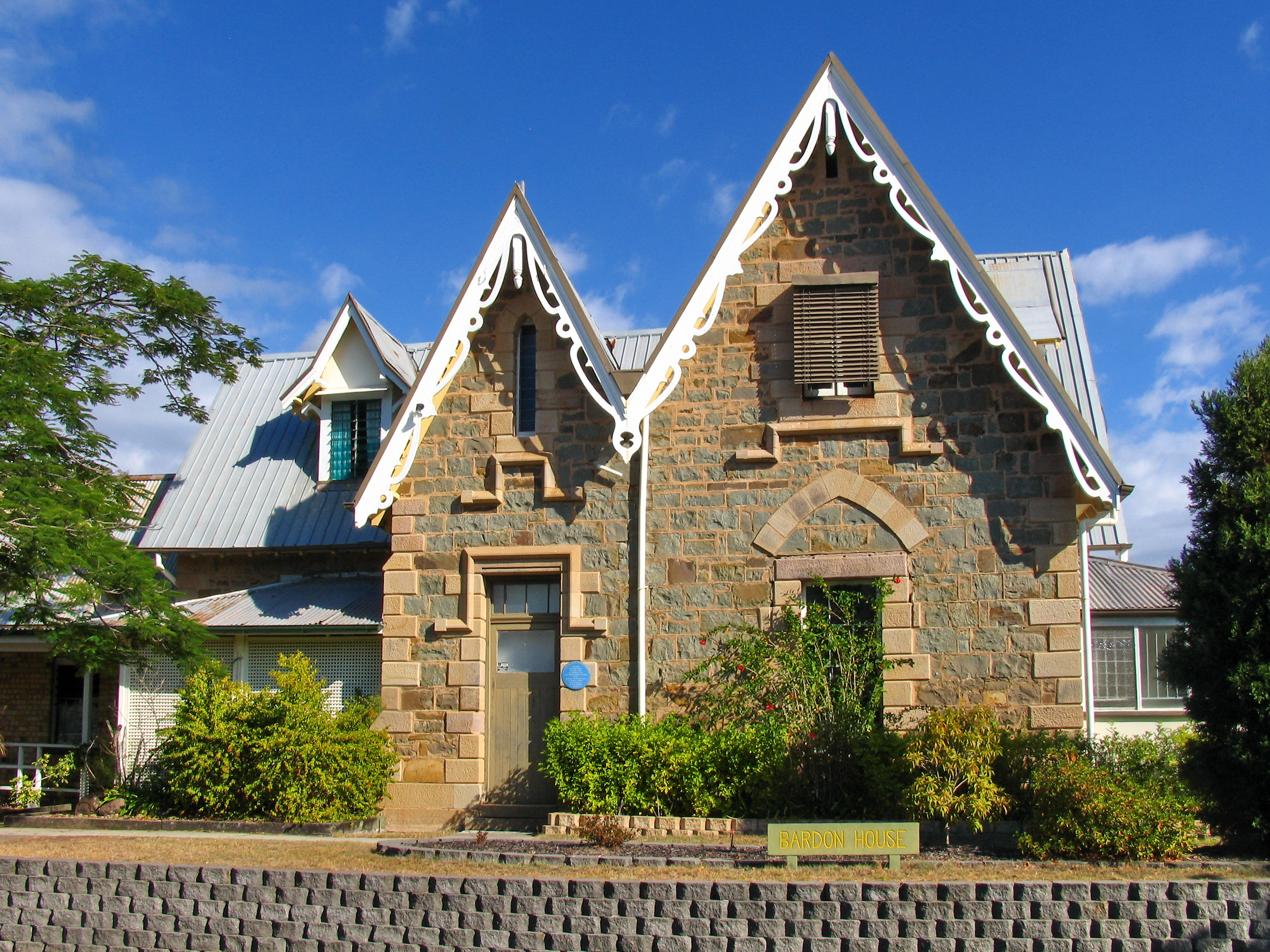
- Bardon House, 2007

- Location within Queensland Location within Australia
- 27.4582°S 152.9804°E
- Location: 41 The Drive, Bardon, Queensland, Australia

History
- Design period: 1840s–1860s (mid-19th century)
- Built: 1864–1926

Queensland Heritage Register
- Official name: Bardon House, Franciscan Sisters' Convent
- Type: state heritage (landscape, built)
- Designated: 21 October 1992
- Reference no.: 600053
- Significant period: 1860s–1920s (fabric); 1860s–ongoing (historical/social)
- Significant components: trees/plantings, residential accommodation – main house, fence/wall – perimeter, church

Bardon House is a heritage-listed detached house at 41 The Drive, Bardon, Queensland, Australia. It was built from 1864 to 1926. It is also known as Franciscan Sisters' Convent. It was added to the Queensland Heritage Register on 21 October 1992.

== History ==
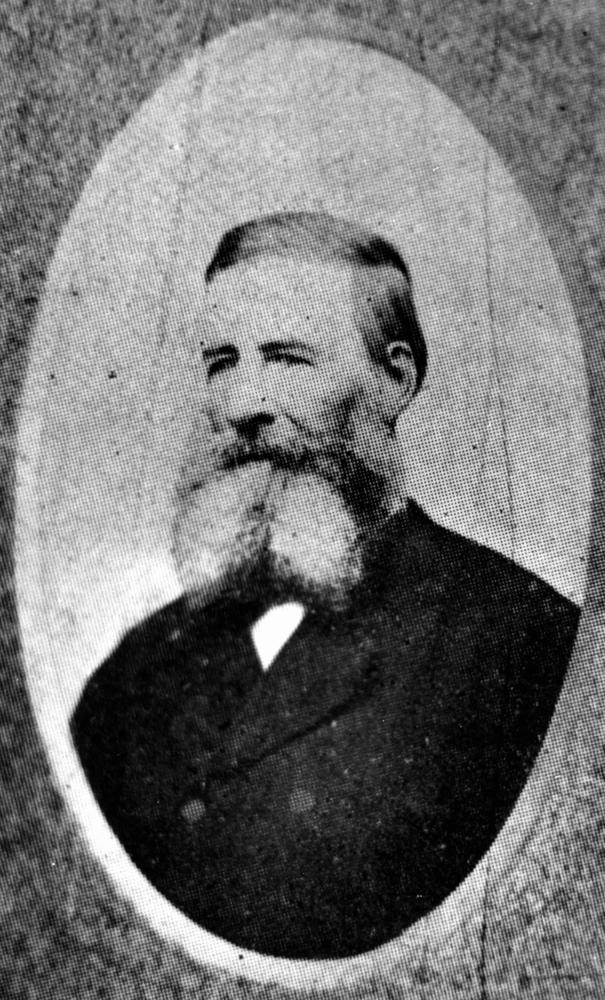
Joshua Jeays, 1909

Bardon House, a two-storeyed stone residence, was constructed in 1864 by Joshua Jeays, builder, architect and early mayor of Brisbane. It is thought that he constructed it for his wife Sarah, who died prior to its completion.

Joshua Jeays arrived in Moreton Bay from England with his family in 1853. He was trained as a carpenter and builder and established himself as a builder and architect in 1857, securing contracts for many notable early Brisbane buildings including Old Government House. After retiring in 1864, he continued to operate his stone quarry at Woogaroo, where the stone for Bardon House was quarried. He was also involved in local politics, becoming an alderman of the Brisbane Municipal Council in its foundation year, 1859 and serving as Mayor of Brisbane in 1864–65.

Upon arrival in Brisbane, Jeays resided at North Quay, later purchasing 39 acres (16 ha) of land at Bardon during the first land sales of the area. It is thought that the house was named Bardon at the request of Jeay's wife who apparently likened the area to Bardon Hill in Leicestershire where the family had lived in England. Bardon subsequently became the name of the surrounding suburb.

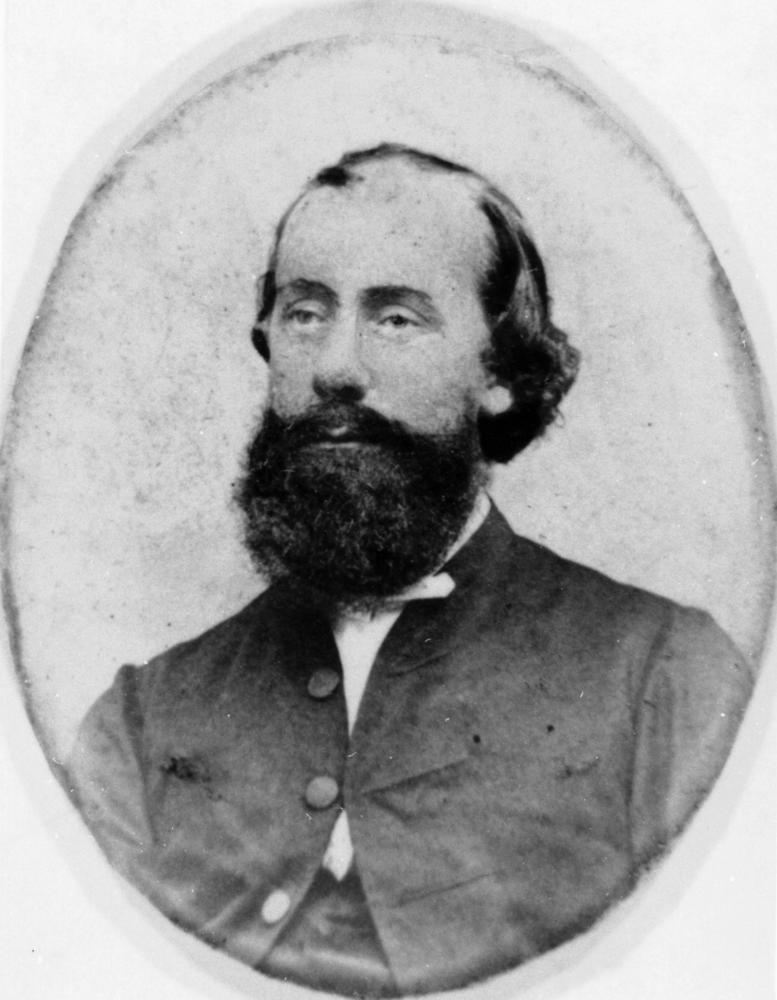
Charles Lilley on his wedding day, 1858

Jeays did not reside in the house, probably due to the early death of his wife, and the house passed into the hands of his children. It is thought that his daughter Sarah and her husband, Charles Lilley (later Sir Charles and Governor of Queensland) resided at the house at some stage. Bardon House left the ownership of the Jeays/Lilley families in 1911, when it was sold to Arthur Exley and two partners. Exley, a school teacher became the sole owner of the house in 1917 and resided in it until James Duhig purchased it for the Roman Catholic Archdiocese of Brisbane in 1925. By the time Duhig purchased Bardon, the grounds had been substantially subdivided.

The parish of Bardon was declared in 1925, the 38th Parish of the Archdiocese, and the suburb was named the following year. The first mass was celebrated at Bardon House in 1925 by Monsigneur Lee of nearby Rosalie Parish. It was held in the central room of Bardon House, with the mantelpiece and table substituting as an altar.

Appointed in 1925, Father Max Irvine, the Chaplain at Stuartholme Convent, became the first Parish Priest, and resided at Bardon House. By the following year, services were no longer held in Bardon House, as a church (St Mary Magdalene's) was constructed within the grounds. It was a timber structure, built on a sloping site to the east of the house. When a new St Mary Magdalene's church was constructed in 1963, the old timber church was retained for use as a hall.

In 1938, Bardon House became the centre of a school established by Archbishop Duhig. Dr O'Donoghue, the Parish Priest, vacated Bardon and the Missionary Franciscan Sisters moved in on January 19, 1938 to establish the new school, to be known as St Josephs.

Additions to the house in the form of an enclosed verandah were made to accommodate a classroom. Funding for its construction and furnishing was contributed by the local Member of the Queensland Legislative Assembly for Ithaca, Mr Edward Hanlon.

St Joseph's school was opened on 24 January 1938, with 31 male and female pupils. By the end of the year, a separate school room was constructed on the site, its erection made possible through the anonymous donation of £1000.

Despite temporary closure in 1942 due to the Second World War, the school continued to grow. Bardon House is now surrounded by many school buildings which have been erected as the need for more space arose.

== Description ==
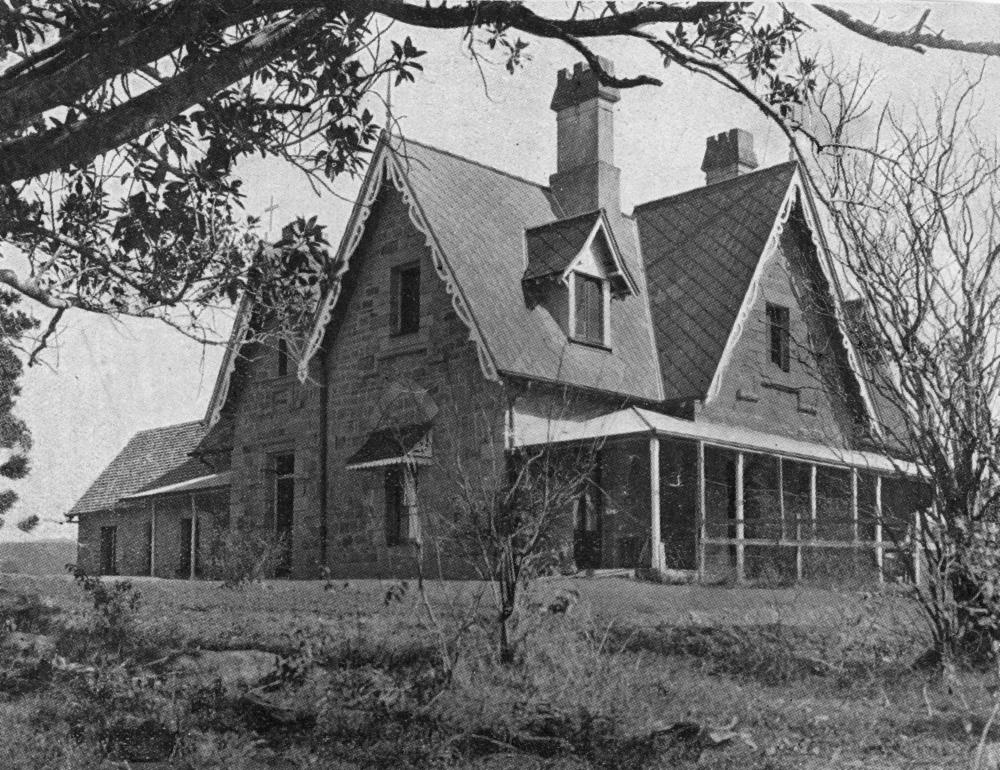
Bardon House, circa 1930

Bardon House, an example of Victorian Gothic architecture, is a two-storeyed stone structure located within the grounds of St Joseph's School, Bardon. The building is located on a rise above The Drive to the south, near the intersection with Cecil Road. Bardon House, originally situated overlooking Bardon and Ithaca Creek, is now partly surrounded by school buildings to the north and northwest, and a carpark to the east.

The building has a complex steeply pitched roof with intersecting gables and dormer windows. The roof was originally shingled, but is currently sheeted with ribbed decking, and the chimney stacks have been removed. The gables have decorative fretwork bargeboards, and the dormers have louvred window units. The building has an L-shaped plan, with the main wing facing northeast and a service wing at the rear to the south. A single-storeyed gabled extension has been added to the rear southern wing, and lean-to additions to the western side.

The building is constructed of uncoursed squared rubble, with the remains of tuck pointing, and rough faced sandstone quoining to corners, doors and windows.

The northeast elevation has a central projecting gable, and an enclosed verandah to the ground floor. The gable has a central louvred window, surmounted by a sandstone relieving arch, with a stepped sandstone moulding below. The enclosed verandah has a corrugated iron lean-to roof, fibrous cement cladding, and louvred and casement windows.

The southeast elevation has a wide gable end to the main wing, with a narrower projecting gable adjacent to the south. A lean-to verandah is located adjacent to the southern wing. The wide gable has a large multi-paned leadlight sash window to the ground floor, with evidence of a former window hood, surmounted by a sandstone relieving arch above. The first floor has a smaller casement window surmounting a stepped sandstone moulding, with a narrow lancet to the apex. The narrower gable has a central door to the ground floor, which is no longer used, with a fanlight and squared sandstone moulding forming the upper part of an architrave. The first floor has a narrow lancet window, with glass louvres, surmounting a stepped sandstone moulding. The lean-to verandah has been enclosed with timber lattice at the northern end, and has square timber posts and timber rail balustrade.

The northwest elevation has a gable end to the main wing, with two courses of sandstone forming a base, and a large louvred window to the ground floor surmounted by a sandstone relieving arch. The first floor has a smaller casement window surmounting a stepped sandstone moulding. A small square window opening, with glass louvres lighting a non-original toilet, has been inserted to the south of the casement window. External plumbing is also visible.

The lean-to addition to the western side of the rear wing has a corrugated iron roof, fibrous cement cladding, louvred windows and a brick base. A single-storeyed southern extension is constructed of Flemish bond brickwork, with a corrugated iron gable roof. The southern end of the southeast verandah has been enclosed with fibrous cement cladding, and has casement windows and French doors onto the verandah.

Internally, the ground floor of the main wing has a large central room (chapel), with a smaller room either side, and an enclosed verandah lined with fibrous cement sheeting along the northeast. The northern room has a central partition wall, which divides the space forming two bedrooms, and which bisects the fireplace surround and window. A staircase is located within the intersection with the southern wing, which has a living room and kitchen with a verandah on the southeast. A music room forms the later extension to the south. The western side has a lean-to addition, containing service rooms and hallway, and is lined with fibrous cement sheeting. The ground floor of the building has mainly rendered masonry walls, pressed metal ceilings, and French doors with fanlights opening onto verandahs. The joinery is painted throughout, but reportedly is of cedar, and includes panelled doors, some with fanlights, architraves, skirtings and some fireplace surrounds. All fireplaces have been filled in.

A small room adjacent to the staircase has an external door which is no longer used, and a pivoting window with coloured glass panels opening onto the southeast verandah. This room may have formed part of the original entrance foyer, but the original arrangement in unknown. The staircase is early, but not original, and consists of a narrow dog-leg with winders, narrow turned timber newel posts and slim timber balusters. The wall to the south of the staircase has fibrous cement sheeting. The rear kitchen area has been altered, with a small room forming a two-way pantry, and a door and window to the western addition being removed.

Internally, the first floor contains bedrooms with a corridor along the southwest side and a bathroom at the northwest end. Walls and ceilings are lined with fibrous cement sheeting, with the rake of the roof sloping to approximately window sill height. A partition wall divides the central room into two bedrooms, bisecting a dormer window. The northwest bathroom, toilet and bedroom were also formed by a partition wall dividing a larger room.

A carport is located on the southern side of the western lean-to addition, and a timber fence encloses a western garden. The house is surrounded by mature trees on the southwest and southeast sides.

St Mary Magdalene's Hall is located to the east of Bardon House, on the opposite side of the carpark adjacent to the entrance to the property. The hall is located on a steeply sloping site, with the entrance on the south at ground level, and the rear of the building supported on tall concrete stumps. It is a single-storeyed weatherboard structure with a tiled gable roof with raised ridge ventilation at the front and rear. Windows comprising glass horizontal louvres are evenly spaced along either side.

Internally, the walls are of stained timber vertical boards to dado height, above which the walls are sheeted with a pale coloured material with dark stained cover strips placed in a symmetrical pattern. The ceiling features open timber trusses and is lined with dark stained timber boards which are diagonally laid with lattice ventilators at either end.

== Heritage listing ==
Bardon House was listed on the Queensland Heritage Register on 21 October 1992 having satisfied the following criteria.

The place is important in demonstrating the evolution or pattern of Queensland's history.

Constructed by 1863, Bardon House is important for the evidence it provides of the way of life of prosperous citizens in the outer suburbs of Brisbane in the early decades of Queensland's history. In 1925, Bardon House was acquired for use as a convent and church for the new parish of Rosalie, and as such, demonstrates the evolution of the Roman Catholic church in Queensland. This is also demonstrated by the adjacent St Mary Magdelene's Hall which was constructed in 1926 as the first parish church. It remained in use until a new church was constructed in 1963.

The place demonstrates rare, uncommon or endangered aspects of Queensland's cultural heritage.

Bardon House is a Victorian Gothic style stone house with a complex steeply pitched roof of intersecting gables and dormer windows and is an uncommon example of this style of architecture in Queensland.

The place is important because of its aesthetic significance.

The house is of aesthetic significance due to its prominence in the streetscape and for its fine workmanship and architectural style. It is important as an early example of a fine quality 1860s Queensland residence of masonry construction and fine joinery. Mature plantings surround the house on two sides.

St Mary Magdelene's Hall is also of aesthetic significance for its high degree of internal detailing.

The place has a strong or special association with a particular community or cultural group for social, cultural or spiritual reasons.

The house and the hall are significant for their association with the local parish, and with the Roman Catholic Church who have been the owners of Bardon House, St Mary Magdelene's Hall and the grounds since 1925.

The place has a special association with the life or work of a particular person, group or organisation of importance in Queensland's history.

Bardon House is significant for its association with its first owner, Joshua Jeays, who was a prominent Brisbane builder, architect and politician.
