= Bardon, Queensland =

Bardon
- Suburb
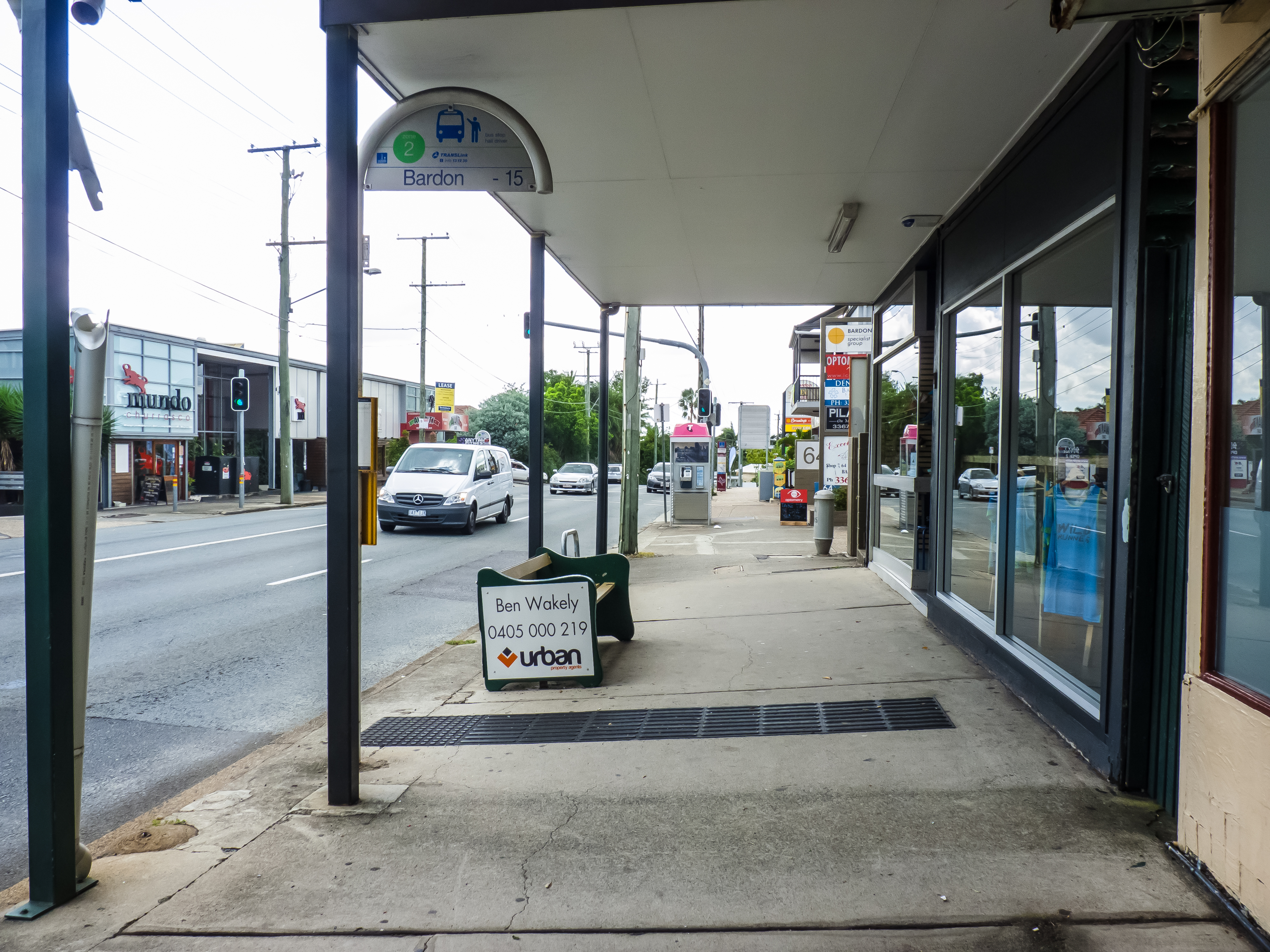
- Macgregor Tce, Bardon

- Interactive map of Bardon
- Coordinates: 27.4583°S 152.9791°E
- Country: Australia
- State: Queensland
- City: Brisbane
- LGA: City of Brisbane (Paddington Ward and The Gap Ward)
- Location: 5.7 km (3.5 mi) WNW of Brisbane CBD

Government
  - State electorates: Maiwar; Cooper
  - Federal divisions: Brisbane; Ryan

Area
  - Total: 4.9 km^{2} (1.9 sq mi)

Population
  - Total: 10,153 (2021 census)
  - Density: 2,072/km^{2} (5,370/sq mi)
- Time zone: UTC+10:00 (AEST)
- Postcode: 4065
- County: County of Stanley, Queensland
- Parish: North Brisbane
Suburbs around Bardon
Ashgrove	Ashgrove	Red Hill
The Gap	Bardon	Paddington
Mount Coot-tha	Toowong	Auchenflower

Bardon is a western suburb of the City of Brisbane, Queensland, Australia. It is located approximately 5.7 kilometres (3.5 mi) north-west of the Brisbane CBD. Bardon is a leafy residential suburb, much of which nestles into the foothills of Mount Coot-tha. It includes the neighbourhood of Rainworth. In the 2021 census, Bardon had a population of 10,343 people.

== Geography ==
Bardon is located in the foothills on the eastern side of Mount Coot-tha, and is characterised by ridges separated by steep gullies. Some major streets generally follow the ridgelines, including Simpsons Road and Macgregor Terrace. The side streets connecting to these ridge-line roads are among Brisbane's steepest. Ithaca Creek, a tributary of Enoggera Creek, drains the eastern side of Mount Coot-tha and flows through the suburb in a generally north-easterly direction.

As at 2021, the suburb was characterised by stand-alone houses on separate lots, which make up 81.2% of the housing stock in Bardon.

Rainworth is a neighbourhood within the south-east of Bardon (27.4667°S 152.9833°E). Originally there was a house with large lands on Boundary Street, Rosalie (now Toowong), called "Rainworth" owned by Sir Augustus Charles Gregory, Surveyor-General of Queensland; it was named after the town of Rainworth near his birthplace in Nottinghamshire, England. After his death in 1905, the house and land were sold. In the 1918 and 1925 the land was sold off for housing. The Rainworth Estate comprises land between Boundary Road and Rainworth Road south to Birdwood Terrace (formerly Heussler Terrace) and includes the streets of Barton Street, Dudley Street, Nestor Street (now gone), Osman Street (then Margaret Street), Rouen Road, Runic Street, and Vimy Street. The name persists through a school and local businesses. Although to this day, this locality name seems to be in such common use that they may not be lost at all, as many residents still associate their residence locations with this former locality name.

Jubilee is a neighbourhood in the north-east of Bardon (27.45°S 152.9833°E). It takes its name from the Jubilee Township Estate, a land sale in 1887, which was the year of the Golden Jubilee of Queen Victoria. Sold in two tranches, Jubilee is the land bounded by Jubilee Terrace, Coopers Camp Road and Ithaca Creek.

== History ==
The suburb of Bardon was originally known as 'Upper Paddington', until it was defined then renamed by the Ithaca Town Council in 1925 after "Bardon", the villa built by Joshua Jeays in 1863 and named for Bardon Hill in his native Leicestershire, England. The house now forms part of the campus of St Joseph's Catholic Primary School, The Drive, Bardon.

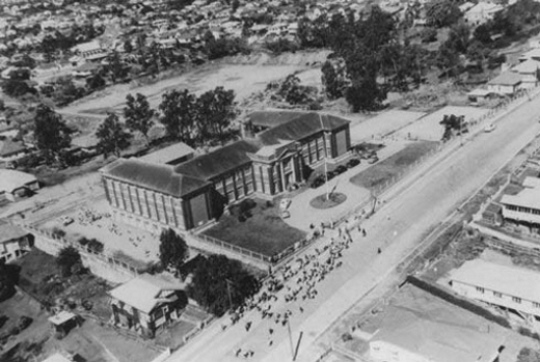
Ithaca Creek State School, 1950

Ithaca Creek State School opened on 28 September 1885 under headmaster Robert Berry. The school had been built with an expectation of 50 students, but by the end of 1885 had 188 students in a single 6-by-15-metre (20 by 49 ft) classroom.

In 1887, the Jubilee Township Estate was subdivided in the north-east of present-day Bardon.

St Bartholomew's Anglican church at 14 Simpsons Road (27.458480°S 152.985510°E) was dedicated on 26 August 1923 by Canon Garland. Its last service was held on 12 September 1985.

In June 1927, 25 allotments of "Wathana Estate" Upper Paddington were advertised to be auctioned by Isle, Love & Co. A map advertising the auction described the sites as "High and healthy with magnificent views" as well as being only six minutes from the Paddington Tram Terminus.

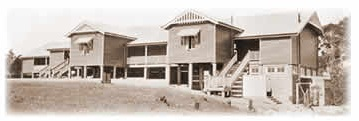
Rainworth State School, original timber building, 1928

Rainworth State School opened on 2 July 1928 with a timber building with eight classrooms (still in use).

The tram service was extended to Rainworth in 1930 with the Rainworth tram terminus outside the school (27.4665°S 152.9845°E).

In June 1929, 42 allotments of "Laurel Estate" were advertised to be auctioned by T. Ozanne & Co. A map advertising the auction states that the estate was handy to state and convent schools and that electric light, gas and water were available at the sites.

In January 1937, the tram service was extended to Bardon with the Bardon tram terminus on the junction of Simpsons Road and Morgan Terrace (27.4593°S 152.9759°E).

In 1937, St Mary's Magdalene Anglican Church was built an 80 Boundary Road, Rainworth (27.4650°S 152.9827°E), and dedicated by Archbishop William Wand on Sunday 15 August 1937. In 1964 a new St Mary's Magdalene Anglican Church was built on the same site with the 1937 church becoming the church hall. The new St Mary Magdalene's was dedicated by Archbishop Administrator John Hudson. The church closed circa 2010 due to a decline in attendance and was approved by Archbishop Philip Aspinall. The church and hall were sold in November 2011 for $805,000. Since 2012 the building has been operated by non-for-profit Magda Community Artz as a local venue for artistic pursuits, known as Magda's.

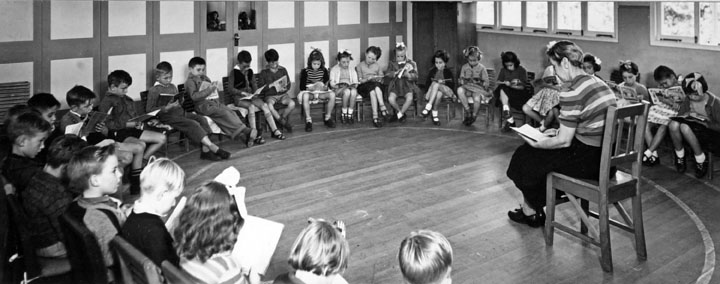
Reading class, Bardon Infants School, April 1951

St Joseph's Catholic School was established by the Missionary Franciscan Sisters of the Immaculate Conception Australia on 24 January 1938 with 31 students in one class. The Sisters were living in Bardon House. Initially, the school was conducted in the parish church (still in use as a school building). A new school building was constructed at a cost of £507 provided by an anonymous benefactor; it was officially opened by Archbishop James Duhig on Sunday 29 January 1939.

Bardon Infants School opened on 27 January 1948, becoming Bardon State School in 1958.

Brisbane's tram network was shut down on Sunday 13 April 1969. Some heritage-listed tram waiting sheds remain include one opposite 136 Boundary Road.

St Mary's Anglican Church in West Bardon was dedicated in 1962 and consecrated in 1975.

== Demographics ==
In the 2011 census, Bardon recorded a population of 9,256 people, 52.8% female and 47.2% male. The median age of the Bardon population was 36 years of age, 1 year below the Australian median. 79.7% of people living in Bardon were born in Australia, compared to the national average of 69.8%; the next most common countries of birth were England 4.5%, New Zealand 2.6%, United States of America 0.9%, South Africa 0.8%, Scotland 0.7%. 90.7% of people spoke only English at home; the next most popular languages were 0.8% Italian, 0.6% German, 0.6% French, 0.5% Spanish, 0.4% Dutch.

In the 2016 census, Bardon had a population of 9,500 people.

In the 2021 census, Bardon had a population of 10,343 people, 51.3% female and 48.7% male. The median age was 38, matching the Australian median. 78.1% of people living in Bardon were born in Australia, compared to the national average of 66.9%. 89.3% of people spoke only English at home; the next most popular was Spanish, Mandarin and French.

== Heritage listings ==
Bardon has a number of heritage-listed sites, including:

- Rainworth House, the home of the explorer and statesman Augustus Charles Gregory, 7 Barton Street
- Rainworth State School, 185 Boundary Road
- Ithaca Creek State School, 49 Lugg Street
- Oogarding, 100 Simpsons Road
- Bardon House, the home intended for Joshua Jeays, mayor and contractor, 41 The Drive

The Brisbane Heritage Register also lists a number of Queenslander style single-family detached houses in Bardon.

== Amenities ==
St Mary's Anglican Church is at 290 Simpsons Road on the south-eastern corner of the junction of Burnham Street (27.4592°S 152.9741°E).

The suburb is home to the Wests Panthers rugby league club, and Wests Juniors Leagues Club (a rugby league club). These sports teams are located in Purtell Park where home matches are played.

In 2012 Voices of Birralee moved their headquarters to Purtell Park and have set up a community arts hub. There are now 400 children and young people who rehearse there weekly.

Bowman Park in Bardon is home to the Bardon Latrobe (soccer) football club, one of the oldest football clubs in Brisbane, and the West Brisbane Cricket Club. The park, formerly known as the 'Cobbler's Flats', was named after prominent Queensland Labor politician, David Bowman (1860–1916), as were the adjacent David Avenue and Bowman Parade.

A small neighbourhood convenience shopping centre and various other shops and restaurants are located in and around Macgregor Terrace.

== Education ==
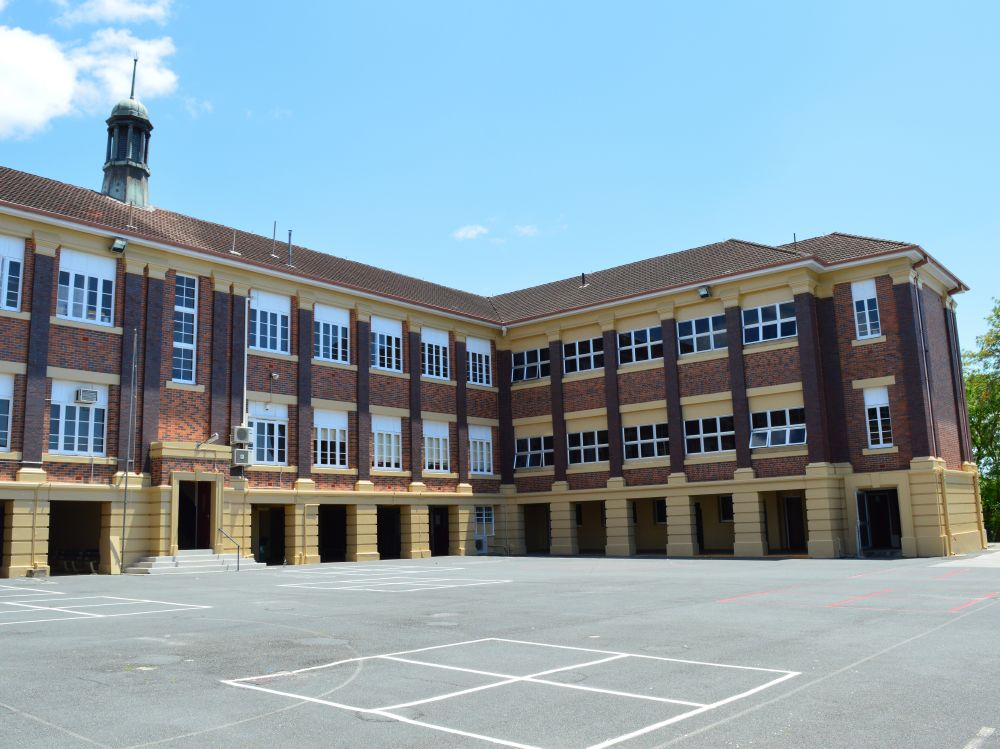
Ithaca Creek State School, 2015

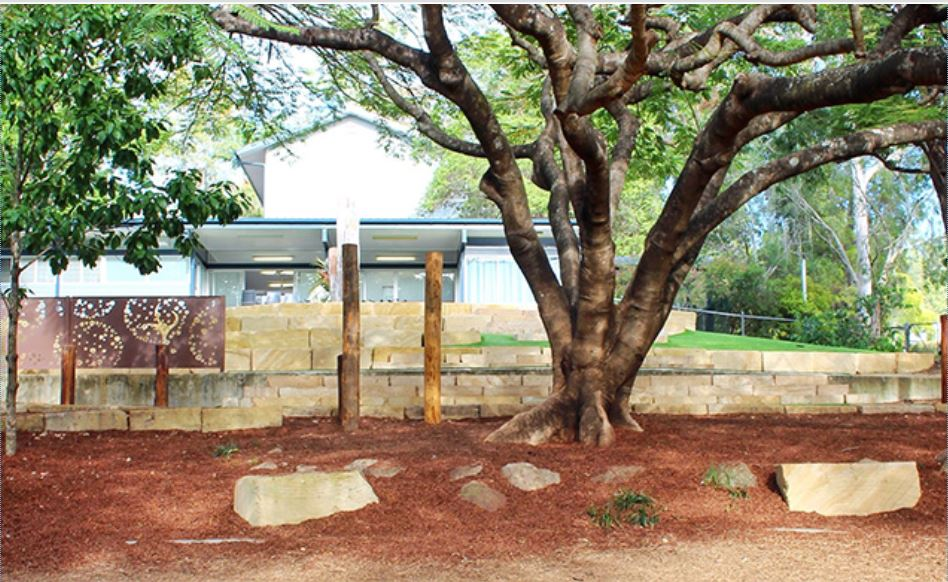
Bardon State School, 2023

Bardon State School is a government primary (Prep–6) school for boys and girls at 330 Simpsons Road (27.4599°S 152.9721°E). In 2017, the school had an enrolment of 316 students with 27 teachers (20 full-time equivalent) and 15 non-teaching staff (9 full-time equivalent). In 2026, the school had a maximum enrolment capacity of 356 students.

Ithaca Creek State School is a government primary (Prep–6) school for boys and girls at Lugg Street (27.4512°S 152.9913°E). It includes a special education program. In 2017, the school had an enrolment of 546 students with 37 teachers (32 full-time equivalent) and 22 non-teaching staff (13 full-time equivalent). In 2022, the school had an enrolment of 630 students.

Rainworth State School is a government primary (Prep–6) school for boys and girls at 185 Boundary Road (27.4670°S 152.9852°E). In 2017, the school had an enrolment of 548 students with 37 teachers (31 full-time equivalent) and 24 non-teaching staff (15 full-time equivalent). In 2022, the school had an enrolment of 610 students with 48 teachers (37 full-time equivalent) and 29 non-teaching staff (16 full-time equivalent).

St Joseph's School is a Catholic primary (Prep–6) school for boys and girls at 41 The Drive (27.4590°S 152.9800°E). In 2017, the school had an enrolment of 376 students with 26 teachers (23 full-time equivalent) and 14 non-teaching staff (8 full-time equivalent).

There are no government secondary schools in the suburb. The nearest government secondary schools are The Gap State High School in neighbouring The Gap to the north-west, Kelvin Grove State College in Kelvin Grove to the north-east, and Indooroopilly State High School in Indooroopilly to the south.

== Transport ==
Bardon is served by several Transport for Brisbane bus services, including the 385 BUZ service, the cross-town Great Circle Line [Route 598/599], the 61 Maroon CityGlider as well as several all-stops services to the city, including route 375.

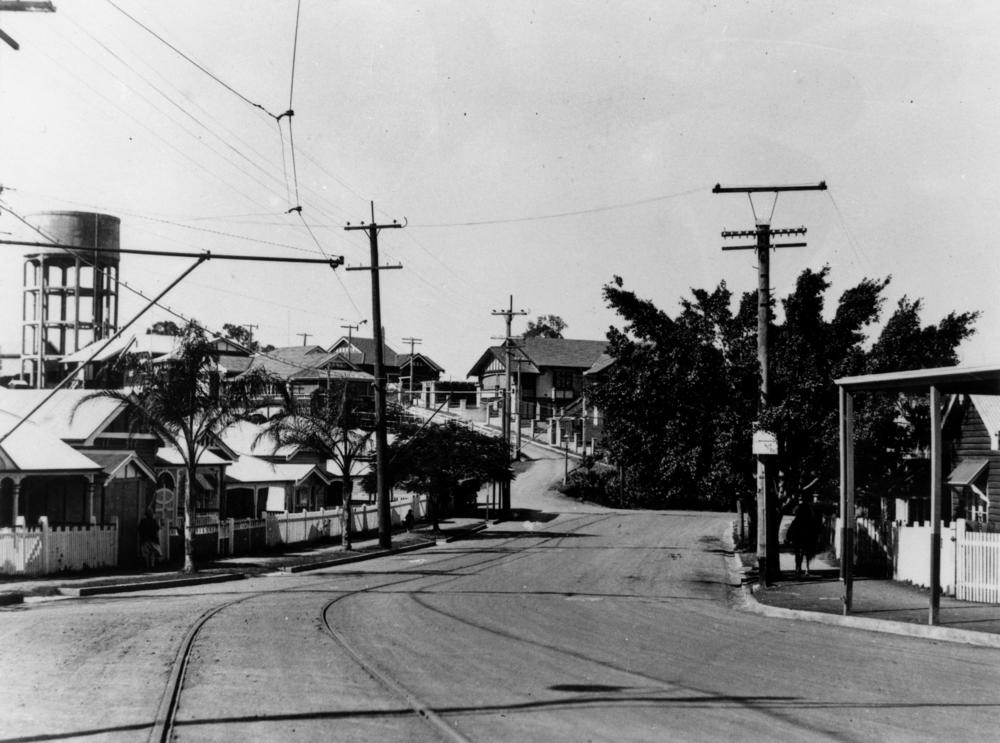
Tram tracks on Macgregor Terrace, Bardon, circa 1929

Prior to 1968, Bardon was serviced by a tram line which terminated at Morgan Terrace [Route 74]. The bus route has been extended from Morgan Terrace, past the Bardon State School, to terminate at Carwoola Street approximately 1.5 kilometres (0.93 mi) further out towards Mount Coot-tha.

Bardon is located on Metroad 5, a major north–south arterial that serves as a western bypass of Brisbane. Metroad 5 is known (from north to south) as Jubilee Terrace, Macgregor Terrace, an expressway-grade Boundary Road (1990s) and Rouen Road through the suburb where it continues into Frederick Street, Toowong. This route provides a link to both the Western Freeway/Centenary Highway (M5).

Three major roads from the west and north converge on Macgregor Terrace, in addition to two major roads from the east and south, resulting in traffic congestion in peak periods. The Queensland Department of Transport and Main Roads investigated options for upgrading Macgregor Terrace and Jubilee Terrace in 2008, but in 2011 funding for the proposed upgrades were cut.

== Notable people ==
Notable people from or having lived in Bardon include:

- Elizabeth Exley, native bee entomologist
- Augustus Charles Gregory, explorer, surveyor and politician
- Joshua Jeays, mayor and contractor
- Hughie Williams, trade union official
