= Joshua Jeays =

Australian politician (1812–1881)

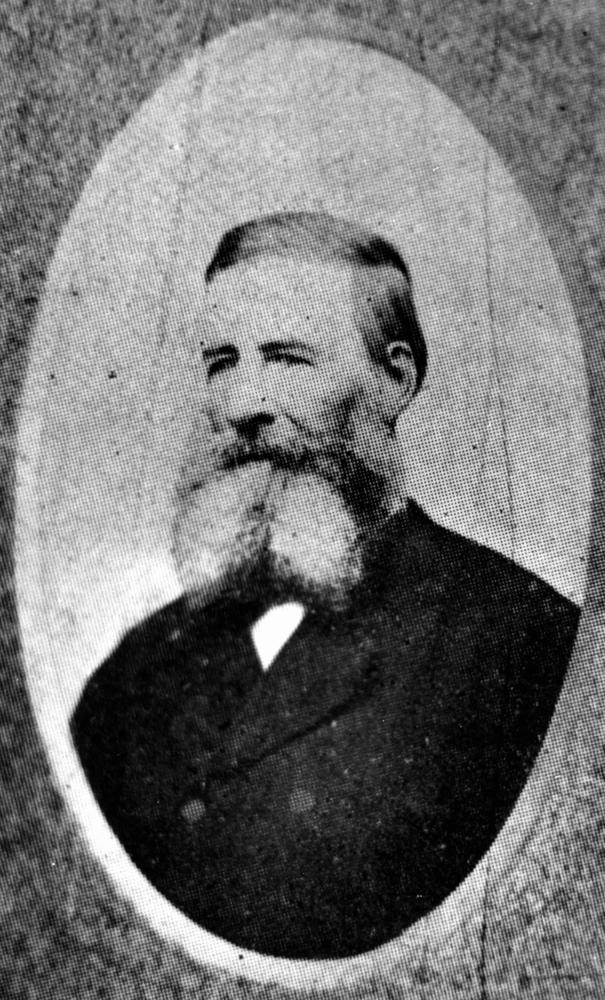
- Joshua Jeays
- Born: 1812; Leicestershire, England
- Died: 11 March 1881 (aged 68–69); Brisbane, Queensland
- Occupations: Builder; politician

Joshua Jeays (1812–1881) was a Leicester-born carpenter who became a successful developer, an alderman and mayor of Brisbane, Queensland, Australia.

== Personal life ==
Joshua Jeays was born in 1812 in Leicestershire, England., and died in Brisbane in 1881, at the age of 69.

He married Sarah Edwyn in 1838 in Marylebone, Middlesex, England with whom he had a number of children including:

- Sarah Jane
- Joseph Joshua (died 1909)
- Charles Edwyn (died 1883)

There may have been other children who died in infancy.

Joshua and Sarah and the three children above immigrated to Moreton Bay in 1853. Jeays purchased land and built 'Roma Villa' on the corner of Upper Roma and Skew Streets, Petrie Terrace (an area then known as 'the Green Hills'), where he lived with his wife and family. His daughter Sarah Jane married in 1858 at Brisbane to Sir Charles Lilley, who went on to become Premier of Queensland.

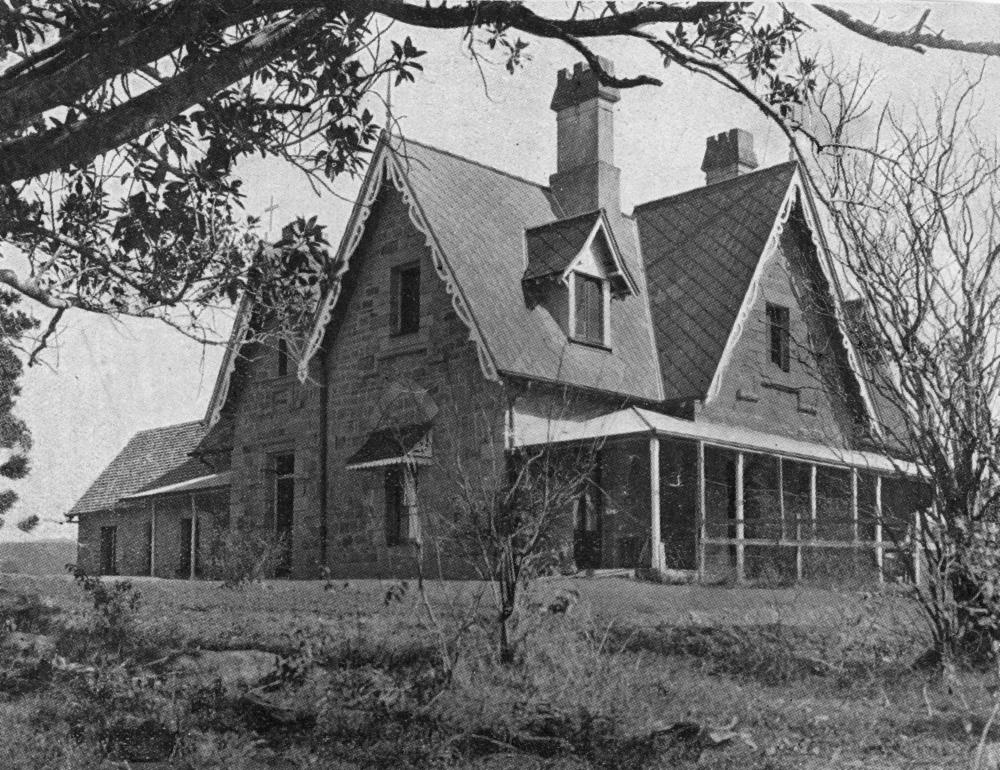
Bardon House, circa 1930

In 1862, Jeays paid £78 for 16 hectares (39 acres) of land along Simpsons Road, from the corner of Cooper's Camp Road, towards Ithaca Creek and abutting what is now Bowman Park (the latter area then known as the 'Cobbler's Flats', because of the abundance of the weed 'cobblers pegs'), west of the area then known as Upper Paddington. His wife believed that living on this land would be healthier for her than their home on the 'Green Hills'. Accordingly, Jeays built a grand English-style home, using rough stone and decorated with gables and casement windows, naming it 'Bardon' after Bardon Hill in his native Leicestershire. The suburb was subsequently named 'Bardon' after this house, in 1926. However, by the time the house was completed his wife had died and Joshua was too broken-hearted to live in the house that he had built for his wife, and it was then occupied by his son Charles and later by Edwyn Lilley (son of his daughter Sarah Jane and Charles Lilley). The house was purchased by the Brisbane Diocese of the Catholic Church in 1925 and now stands in the grounds of St Joseph's Catholic Primary School, The Drive, Bardon.

Joshua Jeays died on 11 March 1881 in Brisbane and is buried in Toowong Cemetery. with his wife Sarah who, as noted above, predeceased him, dying on 26 July 1864 in Brisbane. Sarah was originally buried in Paddington Cemetery but was most likely one of those re-interred in Toowong Cemetery (the Paddington Cemetery was redeveloped as a recreational site for athletics and other sports and in 1914 was fenced off and renamed Lang Park).

== Business life ==
Jeays started work in England as a carpenter. In Brisbane, he worked as a builder, architect and stonemason and was involved in the construction of the gallery of the original St John's (Church of England) pro-cathedral in the Queen's Gardens (1854), the second Albert Street Methodist Church building (1856, since demolished), as well as building homes of prominent Brisbane residents Walter Hill, (founder of the Botanic Gardens), the infamous Patrick Mayne's 'Moorlands' at Auchenflower, and the Cribb family. He was also involved in the development of Brisbane's water supply and drainage system.

Jeays built and provided the stone from his quarry at Woogaroo (the area now named Goodna) for Brisbane's first Government House, now part of the Queensland University of Technology's Gardens Point campus. He also partially built the George Street side of Parliament House, Brisbane, which John Petrie completed in 1868.

Jeays built the Wharf Street Congregational Church, Brisbane (1859–1860).

== Public service ==
Jeays was an alderman of the Brisbane Municipal Council, from 1859 to 1867, including serving as mayor in 1864. He also served on a number of committees, including:

- Improvement Committee 1860–1867
- Bridge Committee 1862–1864, 1866–1867
- Water Committee 1863, 1864
- Lighting Committee 1863
- Incorporation Committee 1864

Jeays has been described as having "radical political views" and as an Orangeman and Evangelical.

== Legacy ==
Among the facilities named after him are Jeays Street in Bowen Hills and the 'Joshua Jeays Conference Room' at the Bardon Professional Centre.

Joshua's grandson Charles Joshua Jeays founded Jeays Hardware.

== See also ==
- List of mayors and lord mayors of Brisbane
