= Rainworth, Queensland =

Rainworth
- Suburb
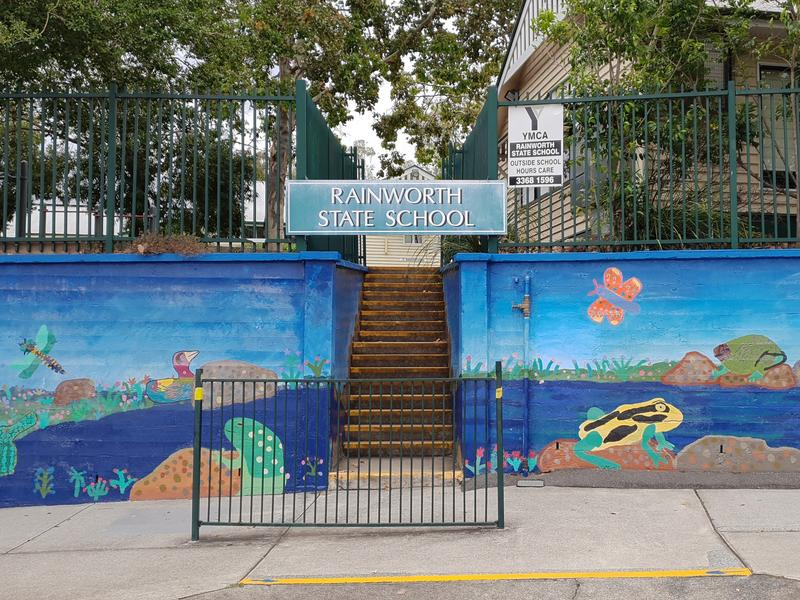
- Entrance to Rainworth State School, 2018

- Coordinates: 27.4667°S 152.9833°E
- Country: Australia
- State: Queensland
- City: Brisbane
- LGA: City of Brisbane (Paddington Ward, The Gap Ward)
- Location: 6.1 km (3.8 mi) W of Brisbane CBD

Government
  - State electorates: Maiwar; Cooper
  - Federal divisions: Brisbane; Ryan
- Postcode: 4065
- County: County of Stanley, Queensland
- Parish: North Brisbane

Rainworth is a neighbourhood in the suburb of Bardon, City of Brisbane, Queensland, Australia.

Rainworth dates back to Rainworth House and its subdivision when original owner Sir Augustus Charles Gregory died.

== Geography ==
Historically the bounds of Rainworth are from Dudley Street west to Haining Street and from Vimy Street (Main Avenue) to the Boundary Road at both section of Boundary Road (one being Metroad 5).

The land use is residential. The architectural system is characterised by timber-and-tin Queenslanders with large balconies and either pyramid or multiple gable roofs.

== History ==
Originally there was a house with large lands on Boundary Street, Rosalie (now Toowong), called "Rainworth" owned by Sir Augustus Charles Gregory, Surveyor-General of Queensland; it was named after the town of Rainworth near his birthplace in Nottinghamshire, England. After his death in 1905, the house and land were sold.

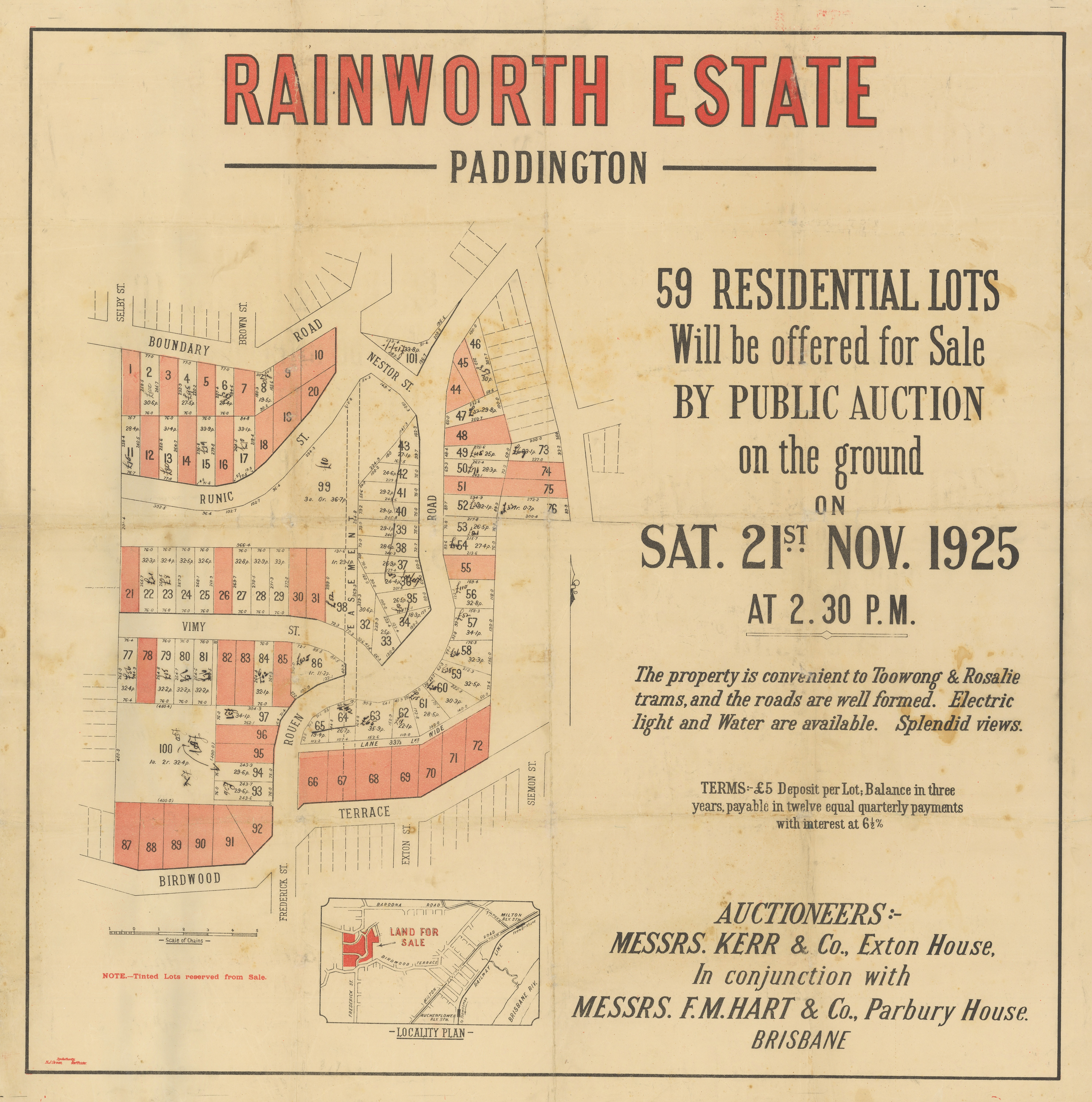
Rainworth Estate land sale, 1925

In the 1918 and 1925 the land was sold off for housing; see the 1925 land sale. The Rainworth Estate comprises land between Boundary Road and Rainworth Road south to Birdwood Terrace (formerly Heussler Terrace) and includes the streets of Barton Street, Dudley Street, Nestor Street (now gone), Osman Street (then Margaret Street), Rouen Road, Runic Street, and Vimy Street.

Rainworth State School opened on 2 July 1928.

The tram service was extended to Rainworth in 1930 with the Rainworth tram terminus outside the school. The Rainworth tram service was converted to diesel bus operation on 25 December 1962 after the Paddington tram depot was destroyed by fire on 28 September 1962. The reason given for the closure of the tram service was due to the excessive dead mileage the trams were required to undertake to and from the remaining two depots at Light Street and Ipswich Road. The remainder of Brisbane's tram network was shut down on Sunday 13 April 1969. Some heritage-listed tram waiting sheds remain include one opposite 136 Boundary Road.

St Mary's Anglican Church Rainworth was dedicated in 1964 by Archbishop Administrator John Hudson.

== Education ==
Rainworth State School is a government primary (Prep-6) school for boys and girls at 185 Boundary Road (27.4670°S 152.9852°E). In 2017, the school had an enrolment of 548 students with 37 teachers (31 full-time equivalent) and 24 non-teaching staff (15 full-time equivalent). The school is listed on the Queensland Heritage Register.

== Amenities ==
St Mary's Anglican Church is at 290 Simpsons Road on the south-eastern corner of the junction of Burnham Street (27.4592°S 152.9741°E).

Rainworth is also home to:

- Rainworth Park on Haining Street
- Norman Buchanan Park (The location of the weekly Bardon Markets on Sundays)
