= Augustus Charles Gregory =

Australian politician (1819–1905)

The Honourable Augustus Gregory KCMG, FRSGS
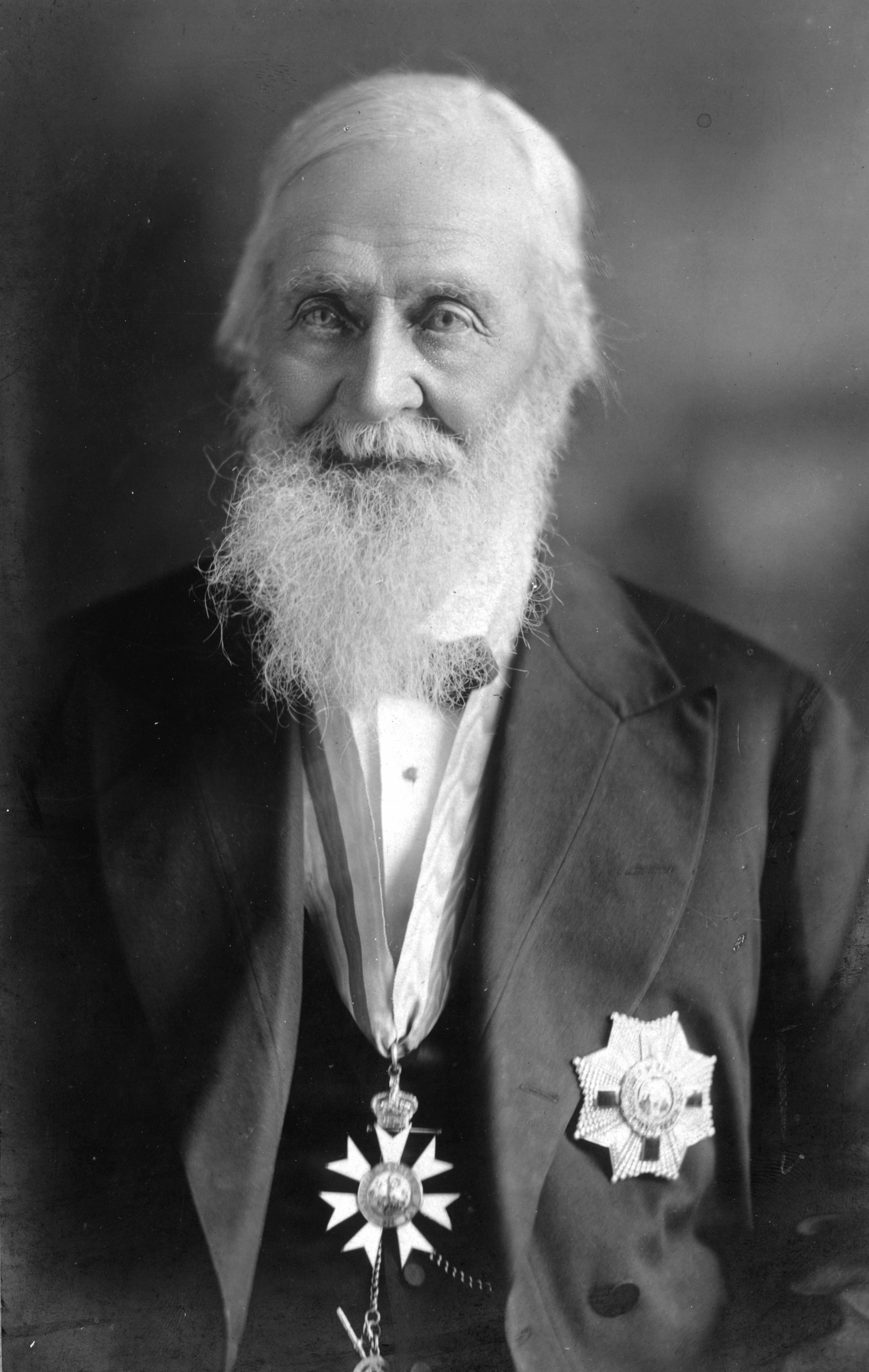
- Augustus Charles Gregory, c. 1903

Member of the Queensland Legislative Council
- In office 10 November 1882 – 25 June 1905

Personal details
- Born: Augustus Charles Gregory; 1 August 1819 Farnsfield, Nottinghamshire, England
- Died: 25 June 1905 (aged 85) Brisbane, Queensland, Australia
- Resting place: Toowong Cemetery
- Relations: Joshua Gregory (father), Francis Thomas Gregory (brother)
- Occupation: Surveyor
- Known for: Exploration of Australia; Surveyor General of Queensland

Augustus Charles Gregory KCMG FRSGS (1 August 1819 – 25 June 1905) was an English-born Australian explorer and surveyor. Between 1846 and 1858 he undertook four major expeditions. Gregory was the first Surveyor-General of Queensland, and was appointed a lifetime Member of the Queensland Legislative Council.

== Early years ==
Gregory was born at Farnsfield, Nottingham, England. He was the second of five brothers born to Joshua Gregory and Frances Churchman. Among his brothers were Francis Thomas Gregory, who also became a noted explorer.

1. Joshua William Gregory, born 1815, died 20 September 1850 aged 35.
2. Augustus Charles Gregory, born 1 August 1819, died 1905 aged 86
3. Francis (Frank) Thomas Gregory, born 1821.
4. Henry Churcham Gregory, born 1823, died London 29 July 1903 aged 79 years
5. Charles Frederick Gregory, born 1825.

Augustus Gregory was educated privately by tutors and later by his mother. In 1829, the family emigrated to Western Australia on board Lotus, arriving at the Swan River Colony only four months after its establishment.

The Gregory family were initially granted land on the left bank of the Swan River, but the soil was poor, and they later obtained two further grants, one at Maylands and another in the Upper Swan district. For much of the 1830s, Augustus took jobs to supplement the family's income. For a while he worked for a chemist, and later in partnership with his brother Joshua William as a contract surveyor. In December 1841 he joined the Government Survey Office.

== Explorations ==
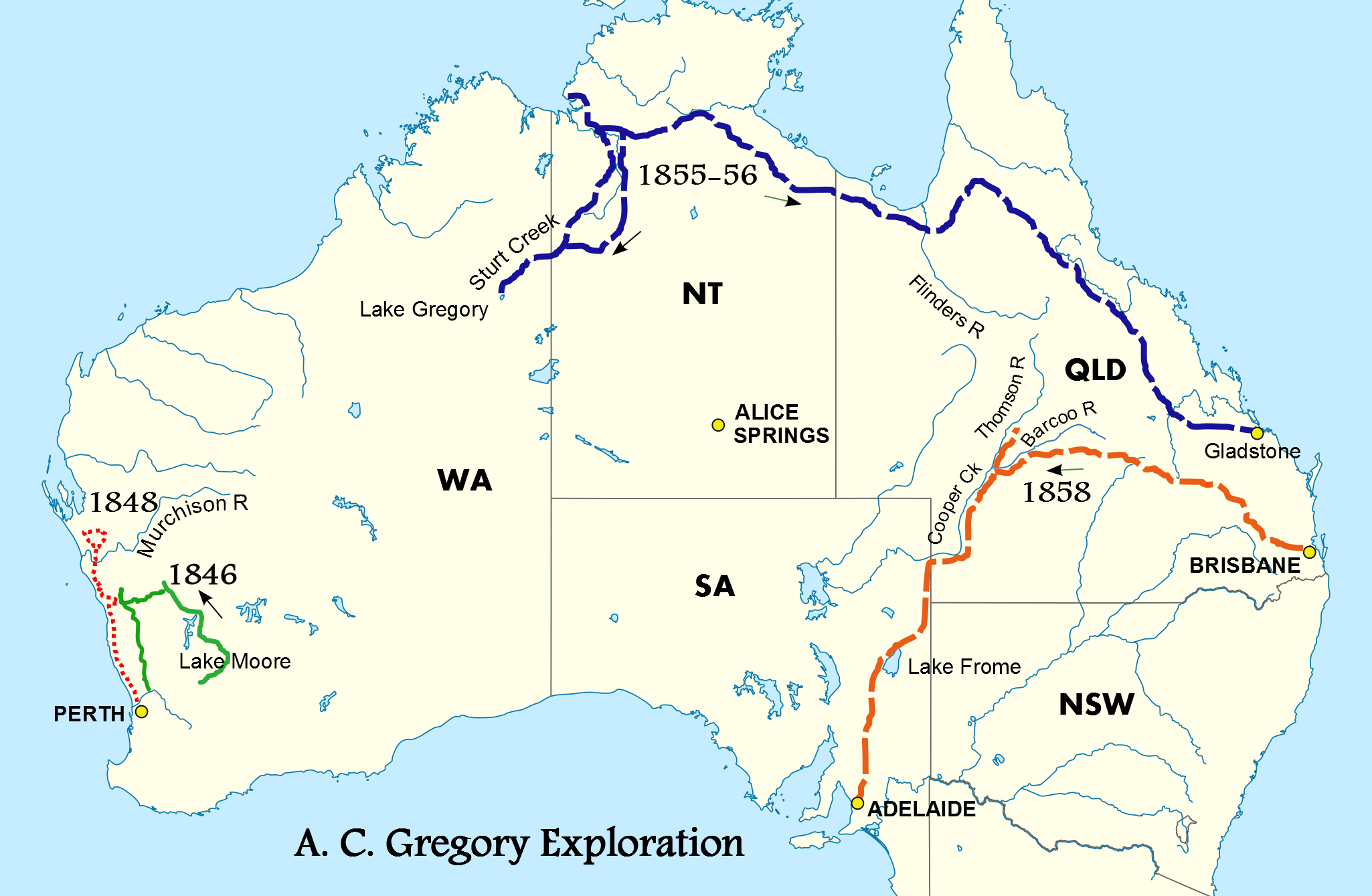
Augustus Gregory – Australian exploration routes

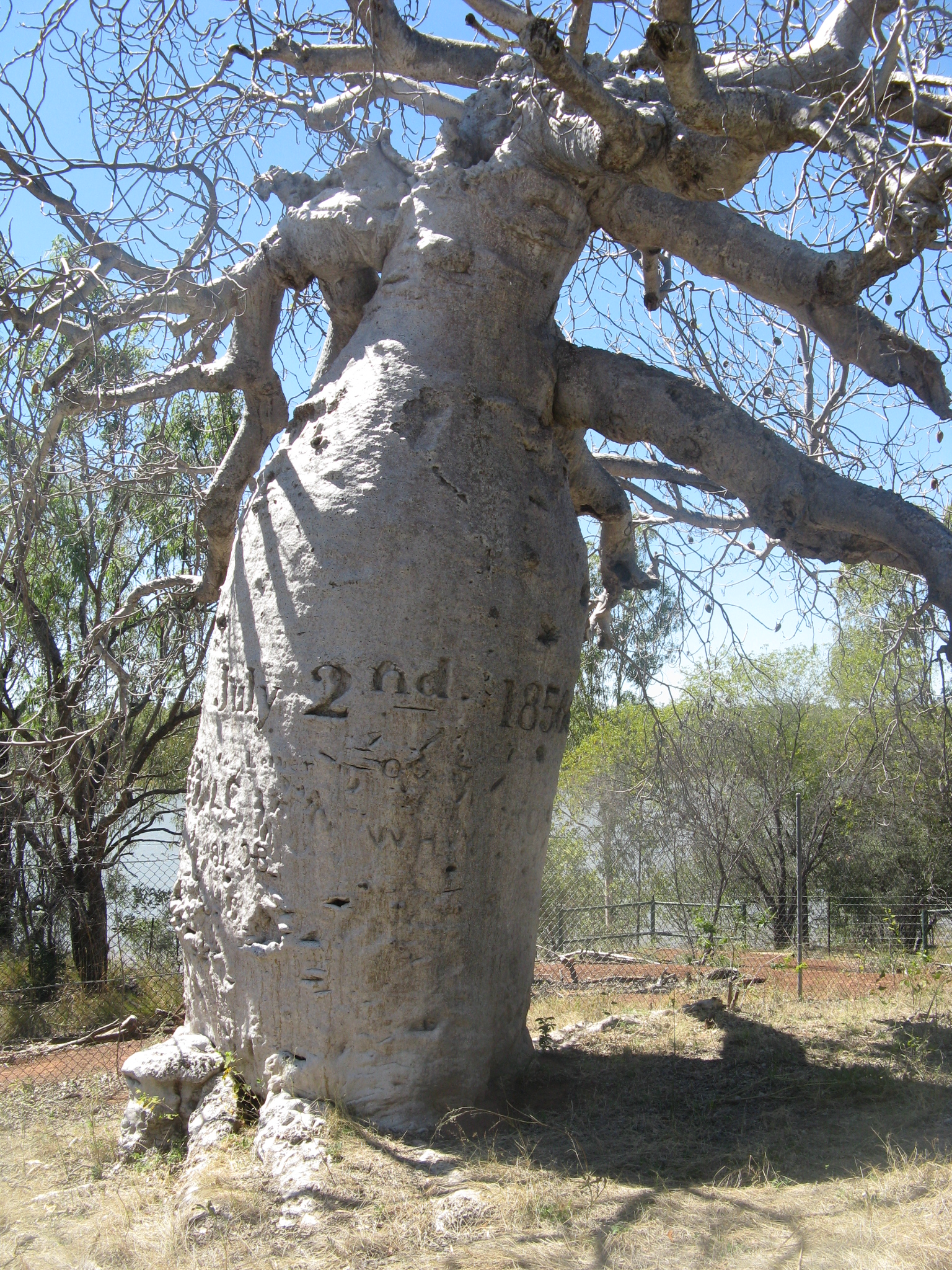
Gregory's Tree above Victoria River, about 20 kilometres (12 mi) west of Timber Creek. The date, 2 July 1856, was carved into it by Thomas Baines, the expedition's artist.

Gregory, along with his brother C. F. Gregory, led an expedition to examine the course of the Gascoyne River and, in particular, to look for new pasture-land. The party left on 2 September 1848, crossing the Murchison River on 25 September, but the country was very dry and it became difficult to water the horses. Gregory decided to turn south again in the beginning of October, and on 6 October decided to rest the horses by the Murchison River.

Gregory had secured the services of John Gilburri Fahy. Gilburri had recently been captured after living thirteen years with the Bunya Mountains Aboriginal people. Gregory made a deal with Fahy to act as bush guide for the mission and lead him to the last known place of missing explorer Ludwig Leichhardt. Gregory promised Fahy would receive a full pardon, which he did in 1857.

They were reunited on 20 October, establishing a camp 20 kilometres (12 mi) west of today's Timber Creek. Gregory led several forays up the Victoria River and traced Sturt's Creek for 480 kilometres (300 mi) until it disappeared in the Tanami Desert. The core team returned to the base camp in the dry season of 1856. On 2 July 1856 Gregory left an inscription on a large boab tree (so-called Gregory's Tree), indicating where he left a letter in case the expedition team should get lost. Turning east, the party explored the Elsey, Roper and Macarthur Rivers, then travelled back to Brisbane by way of the Flinders, Burdekin, Fitzroy and Burnett Rivers. They reached Brisbane on 16 December 1856 having surveyed an extensive swath of land. In sixteen months the expedition had journeyed over 3,200 kilometres (2,000 mi) by sea and 8,000 kilometres (5,000 mi) by land.

== Later life ==
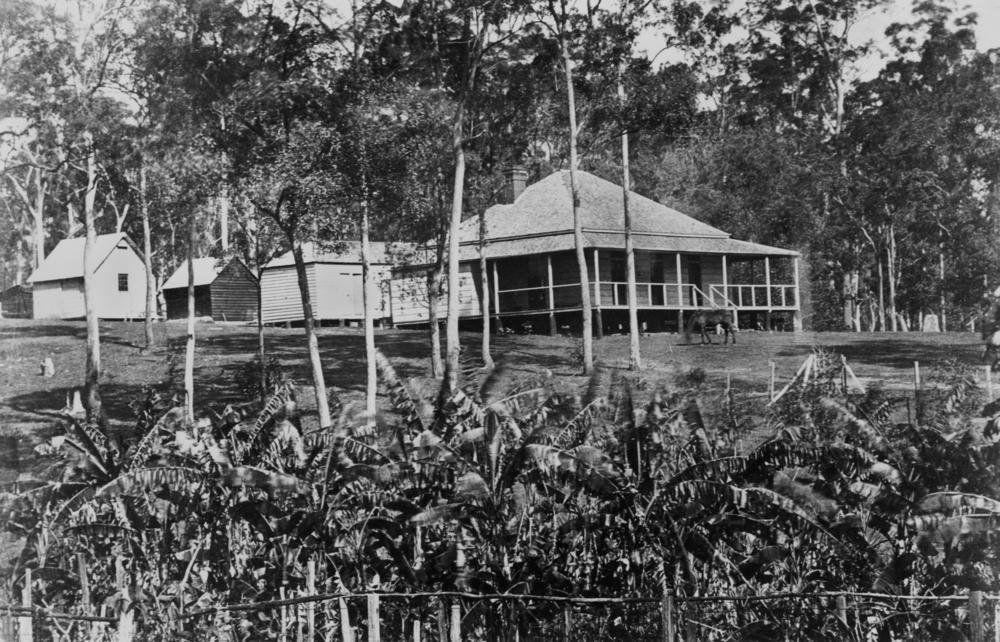
Gregory's residence Rainworth, Bardon, c. 1885

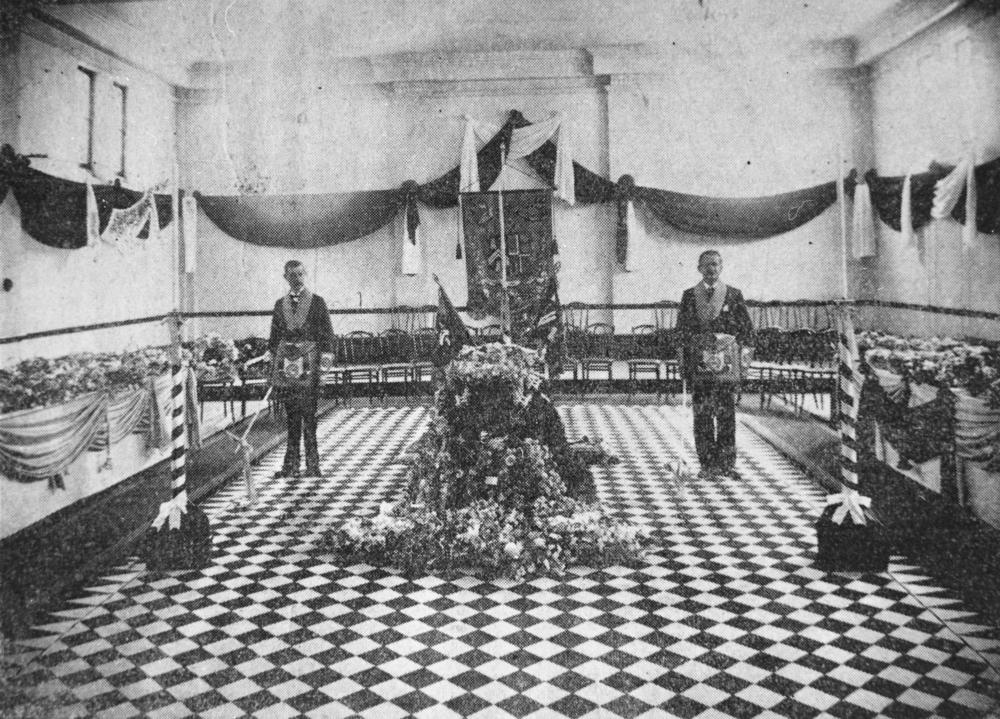
Gregory lying in state, Masonic Hall, Alice Street, Brisbane, 1905

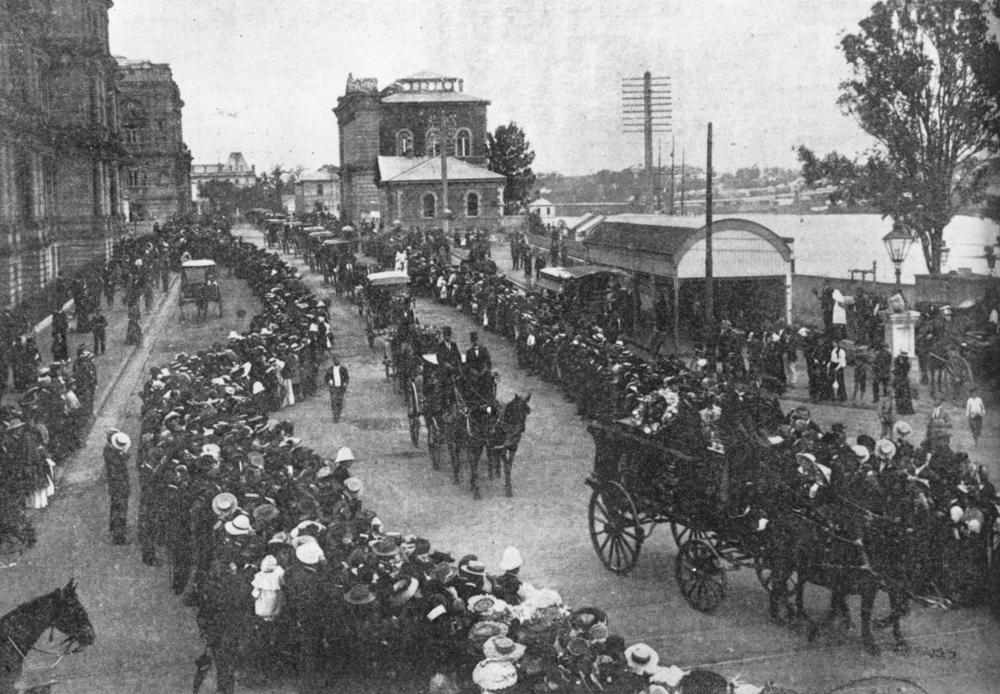
Funeral procession of Gregory, Brisbane, 1905

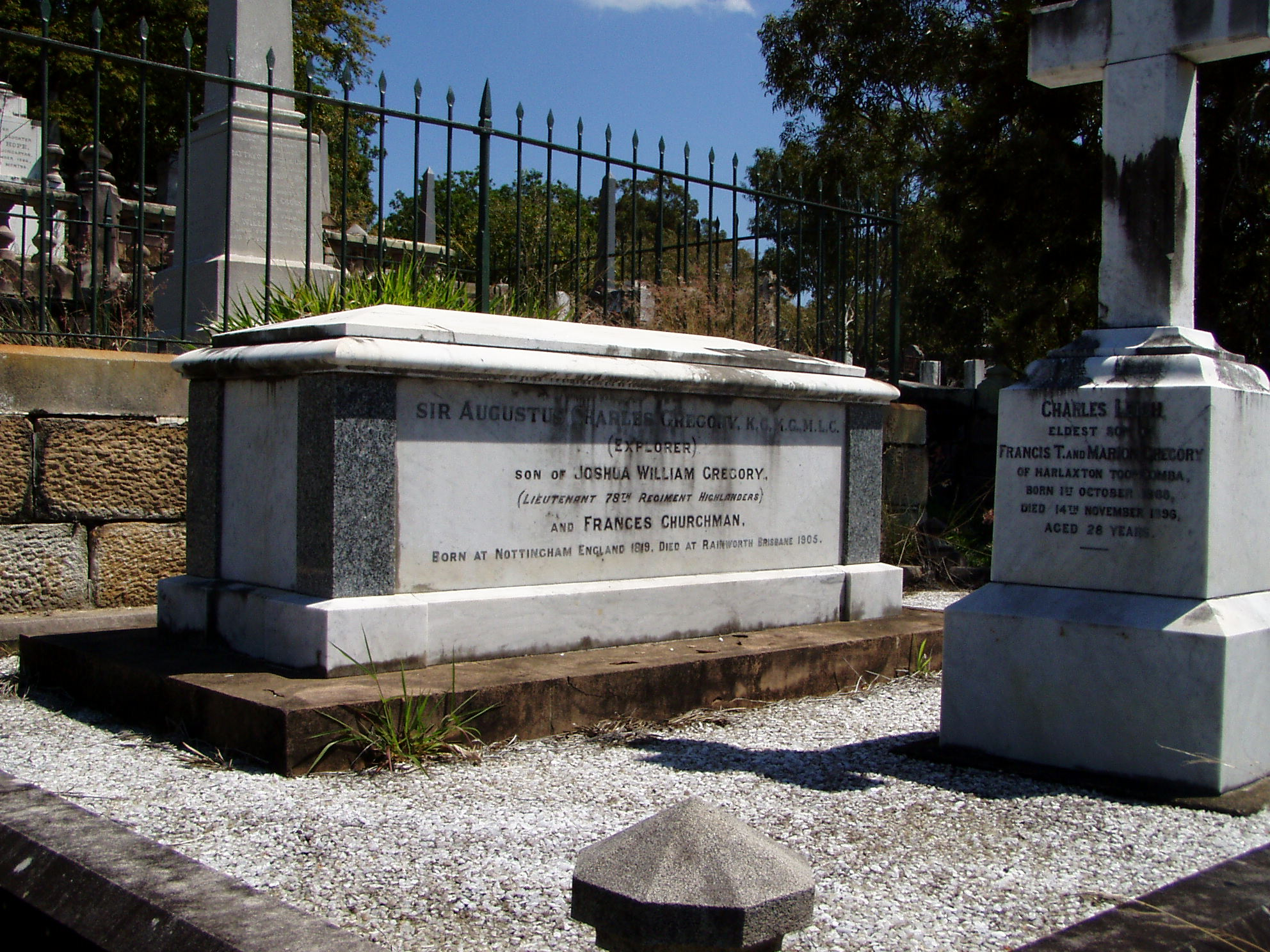
The grave of Gregory at Brisbane's Toowong Cemetery.

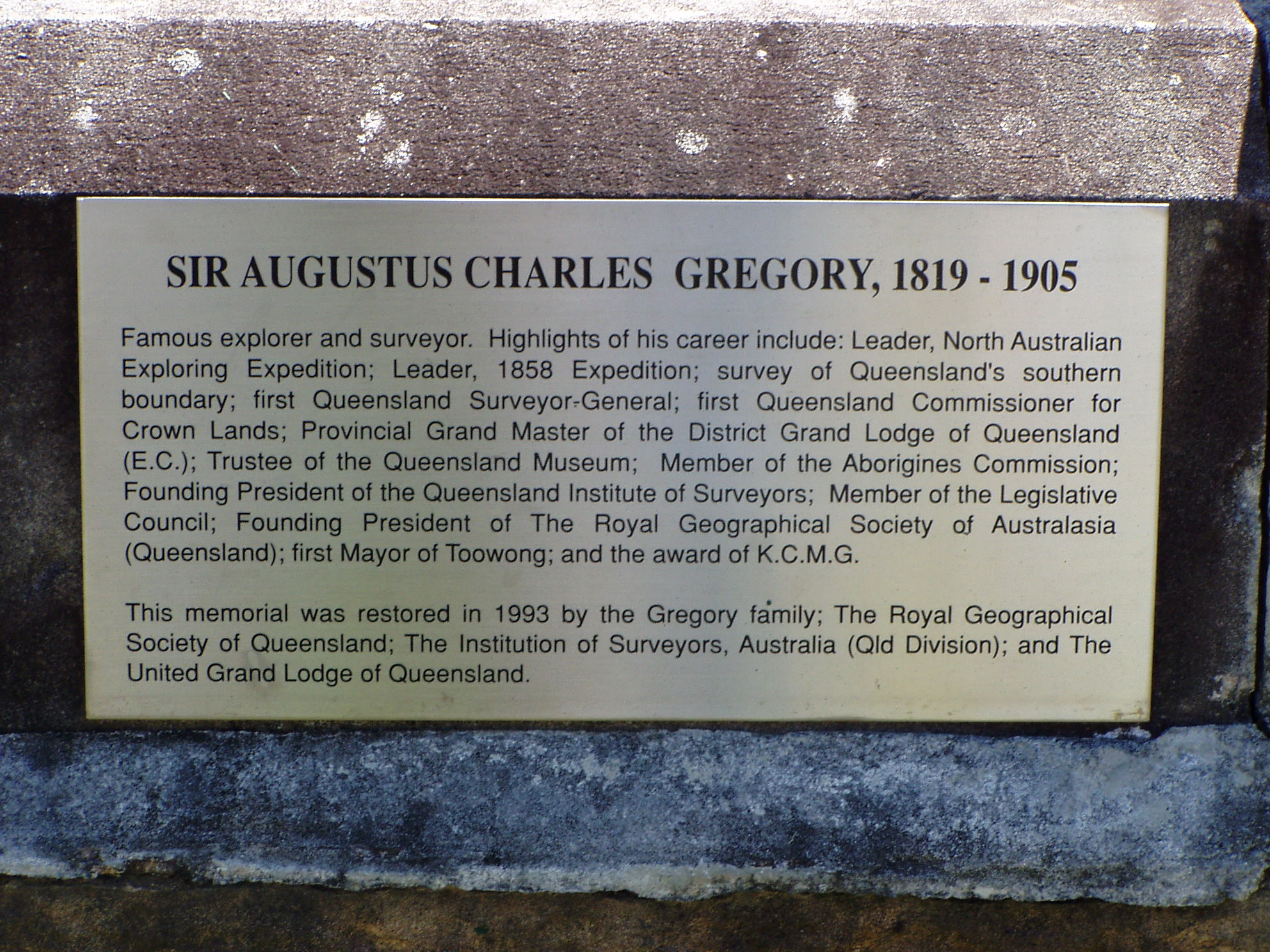
Plaque on Gregory's grave.

In 1855 Gregory became a freemason in the Sydney Samaritan Lodge in New South Wales.

Gregory was awarded the Founder's Medal of the Royal Geographical Society in 1858. He undertook no further explorations but was appointed Surveyor General of Queensland in 1859. He later clashed with William Alcock Tully (then under-secretary for public lands and chief commissioner of crown lands); in 1875 Tully became acting surveyor-general in place of Gregory. Gregory then became a geological surveyor.

In 1862, he built by hand the now heritage-listed farmhouse Rainworth at Rosalie in Brisbane. He lived there until his death. He leased a home he had built on the Rainworth estate to surveying colleague, Walter C. Hume, which he and his family re-named Fairseat.

On 23 December 1862, Gregory was appointed Provincial Grand Master of the England masonic Lodge in Queensland.

In 1865 Gregory, Maurice Charles O’Connell and John Douglas applied for a special grant of land to erect a Masonic Hall in Brisbane. This was granted on 15 January 1865. On 28 February 1865 Gregory was made a Royal Arch Mason in the North Australia Royal Arch Chapter.

From 1880 to his death in 1905, he served as a councillor of the Shire of Toowong and as an alderman of its successor, the Town of Toowong. He was shire president for 12 years, being 1881 to 1884, 1888 to 1890, 1895, 1898 to 1901 and town mayor in 1904.

On 10 November 1882 Gregory was made a member of the Queensland Legislative Council (a lifetime appointment). By the late 1880s he had built a summer house in Southport. With his brother, F. T. Gregory, he published their Journals of Australian Exploration in 1884.

Early in 1895, Gregory was appointed Grand Superintendent of Royal Arch Masonry in Queensland. On 25 June 1895 he opened the District Grand Chapter.

On 6 November 1903, Gregory was knighted, being appointed Knight Commander of the Order of St Michael and St George (Imperial) in recognition of his service as Surveyor-General and in the Queensland Legislative Council.

Gregory died on 25 June 1905 at his residence Rainworth at Rosalie, Brisbane. His body lay in state at the Masonic Hall in Alice Street where many people came to pay their respects; it was estimated that 1,400 people visited on the morning of the funeral. His funeral took place at the hall in the afternoon of 29 June 1905, after which a funeral procession of several hundred people walked along Alice Street, William Street, North Quay and the River Road (now Coronation Drive) to the Toowong Cemetery where hundreds of people were already assembled at the cemetery. Gregory was buried high on the northern slope of the hill below Governor Samuel Blackall's grave with Anglican rites conducted by his friend Rev. Thomas Jones of Indooroopilly.

After his death, his home Rainworth was rented to a number of people, including Robert Philp. His farm land was eventually subdivided and, to facilitate this, the house Rainworth was relocated to another site, now 7 Barton Street in the suburb of Bardon. The house was added to the Queensland Heritage Register on 21 October 1992.

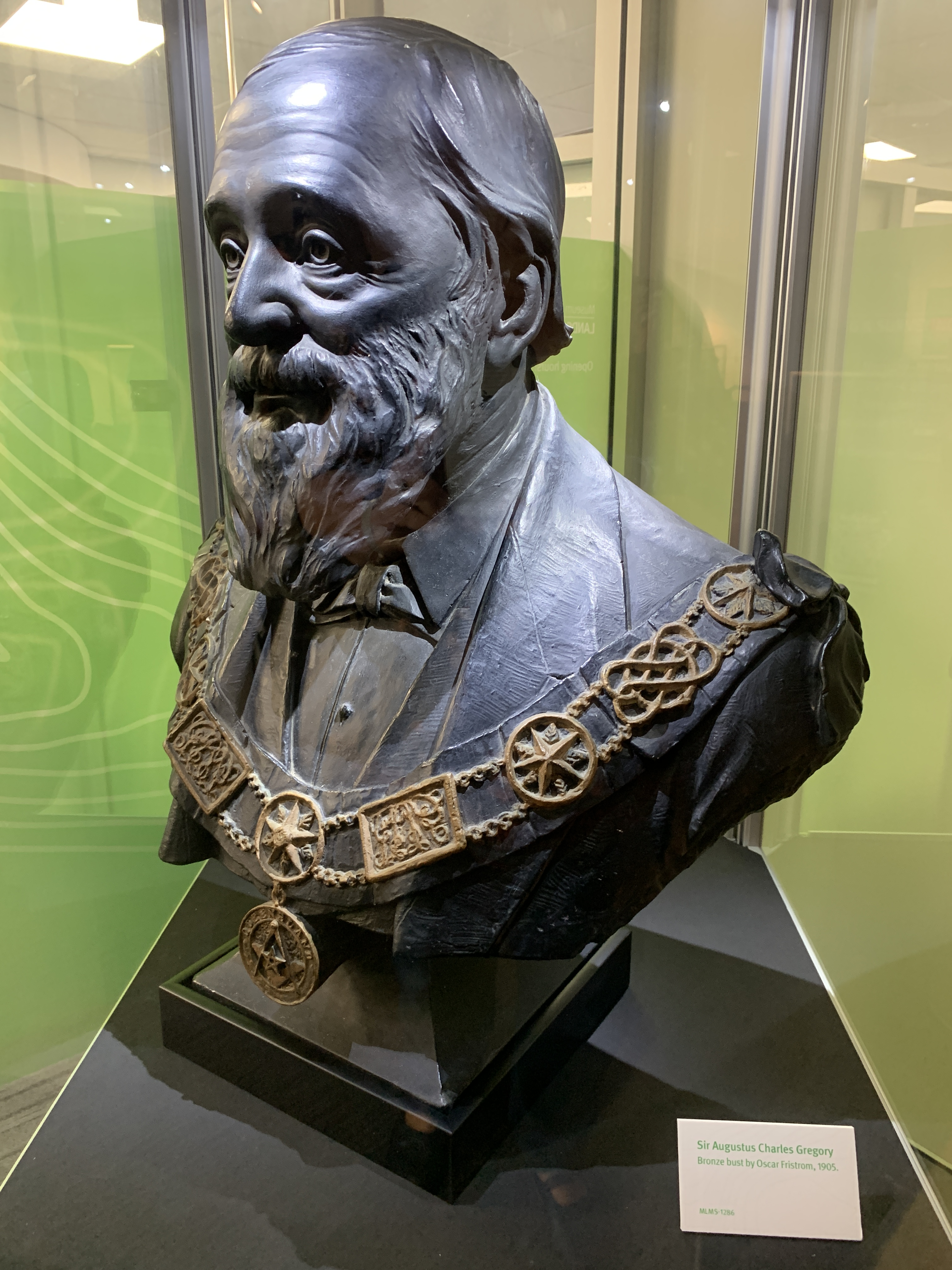
Bust of Augustus Charles Gregory sculpted by Oscar Fristrom in 1905

In late 1905 Brisbane artist Oscar Fristrom sculpted a bust of Gregory. In February 1906, Fristrom offered to sell the bust to the Royal Geographical Society of Queensland but the society decided not to buy it; however, they did display it at an event in June 1906. For many years the bust was displayed at Freemasons’ Gregory Lodge in Cairns (Gregory being depicted wearing his Masonic regalia). In 2018, the Freemasons donated the bust to the Museum of Lands, Mapping and Surveying in Brisbane. As of 10 March 2020, the bust is at the entrance of the museum.

== Recognition and legacy ==
Gregory has been honoured through the naming of many places in Australia, including:

- Electoral district of Gregory, Queensland
- Gregory, Queensland, a town
- Gregory, Western Australia, a town
- Gregory Highway, Queensland
- Gregory National Park, Northern Territory
- Gregory River in the Shire of Burke, Queensland
- Gregory's Tree Historical Reserve, Northern Territory
- Mount Augustus
  - Mount Augustus National Park, Western Australia

Several plants were named in his honour, including:

- Adansonia gregorii, known as the boab tree
  - Gregory's Tree, a boab inscribed by Gregory's party in 1856
- Brachychiton gregorii, known as the desert kurrajong
- Cochlospermum gregorii, a species of the Cochlospermum genus, many of which have the common name 'native kapok' or 'cotton tree'; native to the Northern Territory and Queensland.

The road Gregory Gardens in his birthplace Farnsfield, Nottinghamshire, England was named after him.

His home Rainworth was the origin of the name of Rainworth, Queensland, a suburb (now locality) in Brisbane.

Awards
| Preceded by Robert Logan Jack and Robert Etheridge, Jr. | Clarke Medal; 1896 | Succeeded by John Murray |

== See also ==
- European exploration of Australia
- List of explorers
- Gilburri
