= Rainworth House, Bardon =

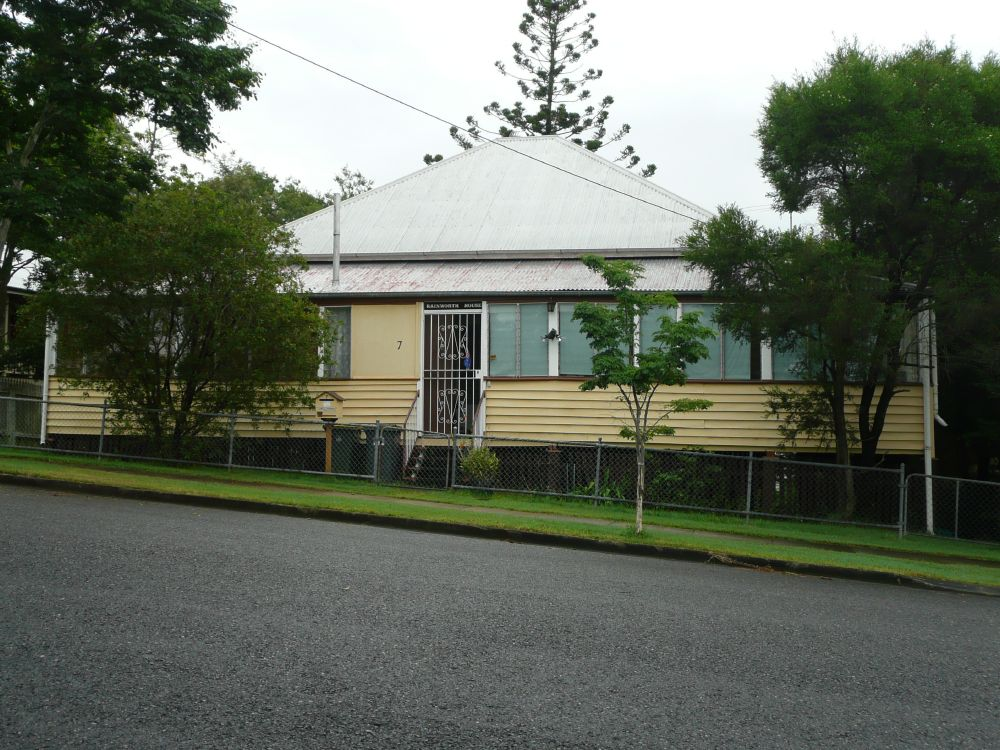
- Rainworth House, 2009

- Location within Queensland Location within Australia
- 27.4667°S 152.9898°E
- Location: 7 Barton Street, Bardon, City of Brisbane, Queensland, Australia

History
- Design period: 1840s–1860s (mid-19th century)
- Built: c. 1862
- Built for: Augustus Charles Gregory

Site notes
- Architect: Augustus Charles Gregory

Queensland Heritage Register
- Official name: Rainworth
- Type: state heritage (built)
- Designated: 21 October 1992
- Reference no.: 600282
- Significant period: 1860s (fabric); 1860s–1905 (historical)
- Significant components: residential accommodation – main house
- Builders: Augustus Charles Gregory

Rainworth is a heritage-listed detached house at 7 Barton Street, Bardon, City of Brisbane, Queensland, Australia. It was built c. 1862. It was added to the Queensland Heritage Register on 21 October 1992. The house gives its name to the former suburb of Rainworth (now a locality within Bardon).

== History ==
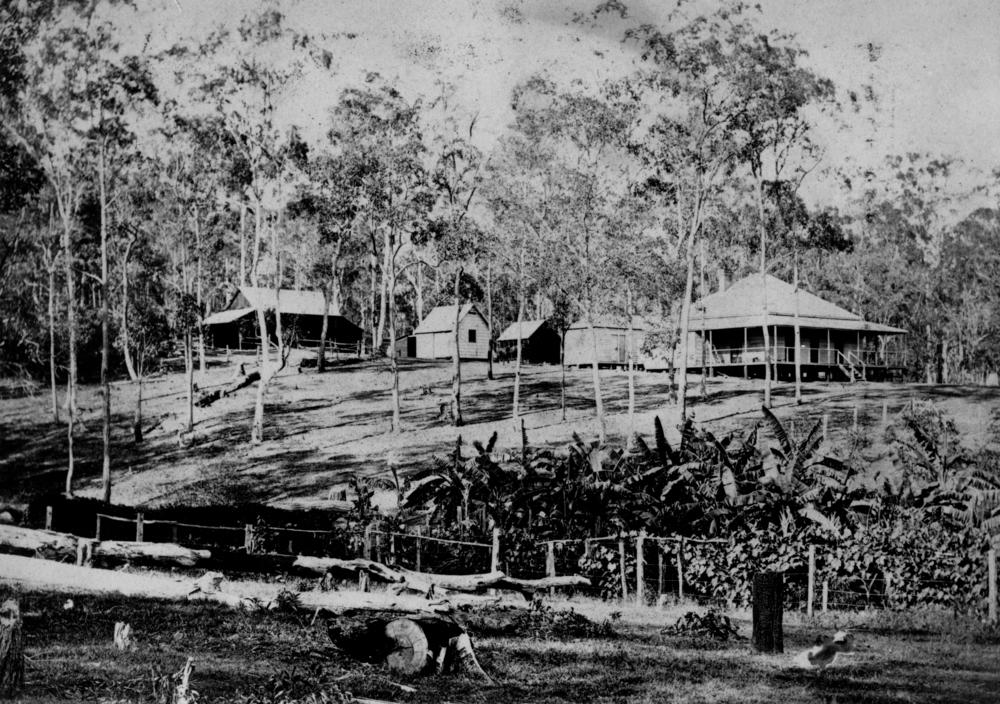
Early view of Rainworth homestead and outbuildings, circa 1875

Sir Augustus Charles Gregory KCMG CMG FRGS MLC, famed explorer, and surveyor-general of Queensland from 1859 to 1879, built and lived in Rainworth House from 1862 until his death in 1905. He reputedly constructed the dwelling himself. Gregory was a dominant, conservative Member of the Queensland Legislative Council.

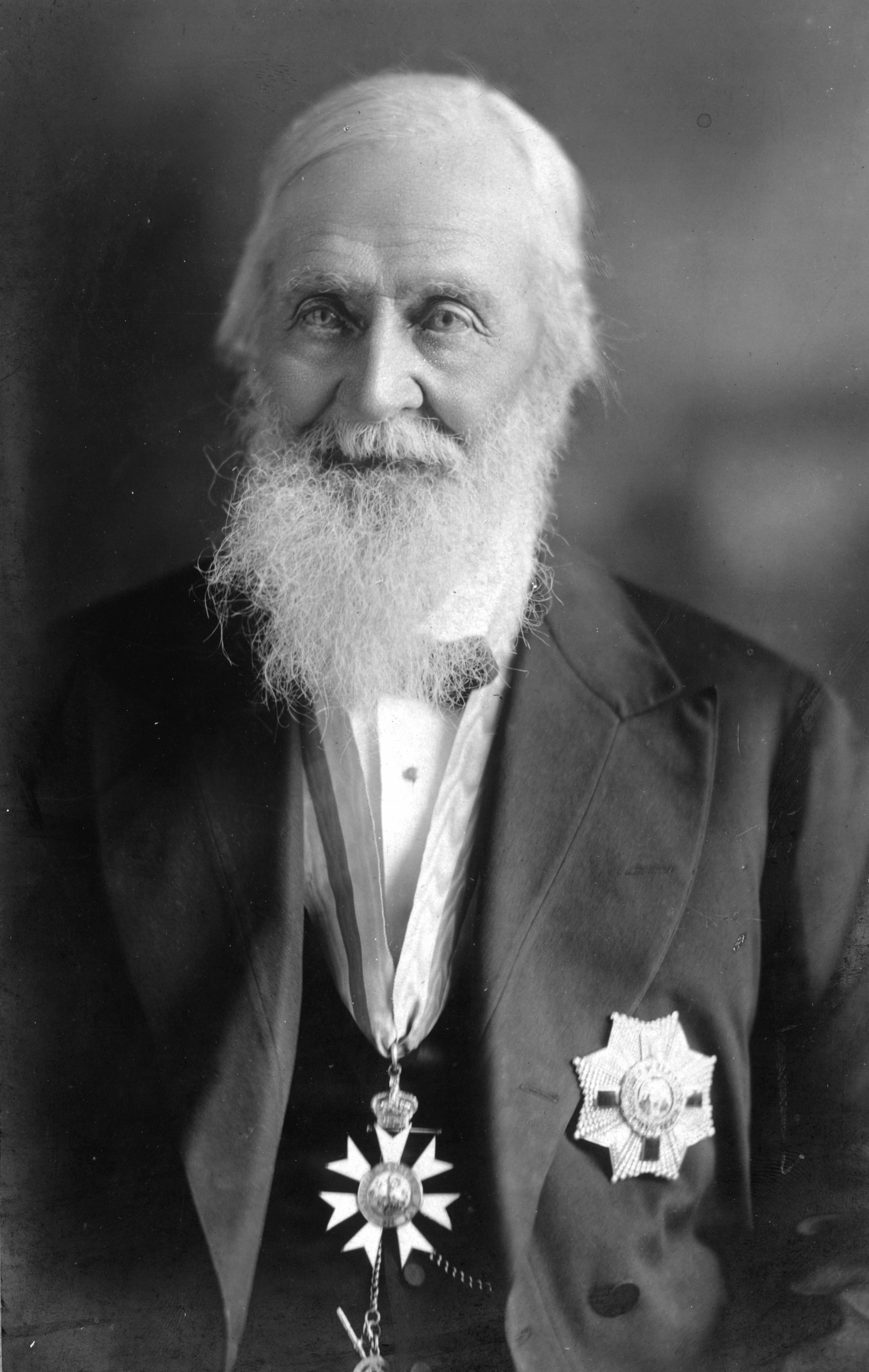
Sir Augustus Gregory

He was also a vital personality in Toowong Town Council, a leading Queensland freemason and an influential amateur scientist. Rainworth House was his rural retreat, his homestead, the place where he could think, invent, create and write.

Unlike Gregory, the subsequent owner, Robert Philp, merchant and politician, rented the property, as did ensuing owners. Subdivision of Gregory's country estate necessitated shifting the house to a more accommodating position. In 1949 it was rented and later purchased by Frederick and Mildred Howell, whose descendants occupy the premises.

== Description ==
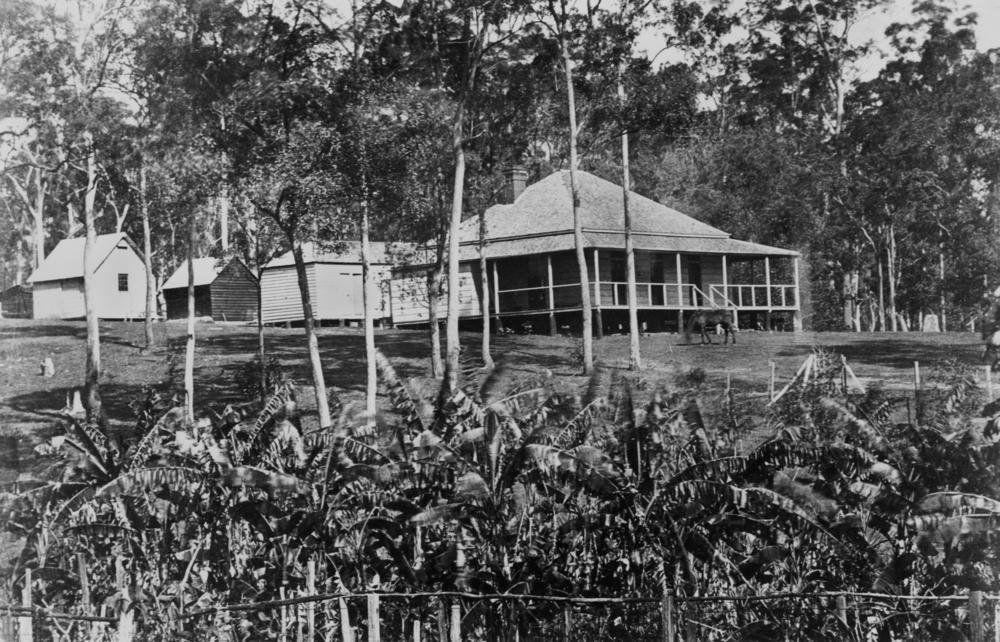
Rainworth, residence of Sir Augustus Charles Gregory, Bardon, circa 1885

Rainworth is a vernacular, short-ridge roofed house with stepped but straight-roofed verandahs on three sides. The front elevation shows three pairs of French doors, and one on the lefthand side. Early photographs indicate that the rear of each side verandah had been built to form an enclosed pavilion.

Most exterior walls are of twelve inch chamfer-boards, while interior walls are lined horizontally with beaded tongue and groove boards, as are the high ceilings. For ventilation purposes, casement windows with small wooden knobs may be opened above the French doors.

== Heritage listing ==
Rainworth was listed on the Queensland Heritage Register on 21 October 1992 having satisfied the following criteria.

The place is important in demonstrating the evolution or pattern of Queensland's history.

Rainworth is a scarce example of a vernacular 1860s dwelling of the steeply pitched short-ridge roof variety. In this case it was built as a farmhouse but is now part of suburban Brisbane.

Rainworth is most important because of its long and personal connection with Sir A.C. Gregory. It still bears the stamp of Gregory the practical bushman rather than the prominent public figure. His standing is recognised in such placenames as Gregory Street, Toowong and Gregory Park, Milton, not to mention the locality of Rainworth itself.

The place is important in demonstrating the principal characteristics of a particular class of cultural places.

Rainworth is a scarce example of a vernacular 1860s dwelling of the steeply pitched short-ridge roof variety. In this case it was built as a farmhouse but is now part of suburban Brisbane.

The place has a special association with the life or work of a particular person, group or organisation of importance in Queensland's history.

Rainworth is most important because of its long and personal connection with Sir A.C. Gregory. It still bears the stamp of Gregory the practical bushman rather than the prominent public figure. His standing is recognised in such placenames as Gregory Street, Toowong and Gregory Park, Milton, not to mention the locality of Rainworth itself.
