= Milton State School =

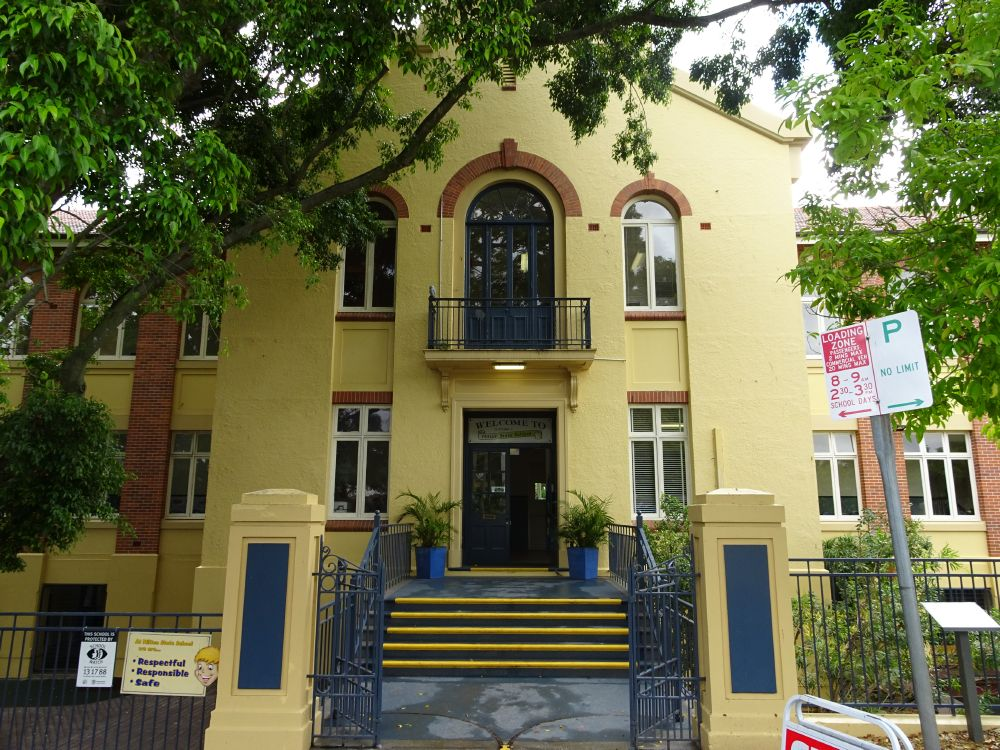
- Entrance to Block A

- Location within Queensland
- 27.4672°S 152.9989°E
- Location: Bayswater Street, Milton, City of Brisbane, Queensland, Australia

History
- Design period: 1919–1930s (Interwar period)
- Built: 1923–1936, 1935–1937, 1935–1937

Site notes
- Architectural style: Spanish Mission

Queensland Heritage Register
- Official name: Milton State School
- Type: state heritage
- Designated: 28 April 2017
- Reference no.: 650049
- Type: Education, research, scientific facility: school – state (primary)
- Theme: Educating Queenslanders: Providing primary schooling
- Builders: Queensland Department of Public Works

Milton State School is a heritage-listed state school at Bayswater Street, Milton, City of Brisbane, Queensland, Australia. It was built from 1923 to 1936 by Queensland Department of Public Works. It was added to the Queensland Heritage Register on 28 April 2017.

== History ==
Milton State School opened in 1889, as Rosalie State School, on its current site approximately two kilometres west of the Brisbane CBD. The school is important in demonstrating the evolution of state education and its associated architecture. In 2017 Milton State School retains a Depression-era brick school building, retaining walls and stairs (1935–37); a re-purposed two-storey timber classroom building (1923); and mature trees. The school has been in continuous operation since its establishment.

The land north of the Milton Reach of the Brisbane River and southwest of the North Brisbane Burial Ground (used 1843–75, later Lang Park), part of the traditional lands of the Turrbal people, was outside Brisbane's original town limits. Large suburban allotments were sold in the area in the 1850s. The suburb of Milton is named after Ambrose Eldridge's "Milton House", built near the river in the early 1850s when Eldridge was farming cotton. During the 1860s, the Paddington, Milton, and Auchenflower area consisted of large houses on acreage, but denser settlement later occurred due to the opening of the Main Line railway to Ipswich in 1875; and Milton developed a mix of worker's cottages, small businesses and industry. A distillery opened at Milton in 1871, followed by the Castlemaine brewery in 1878, and there was a population boom during the 1880s due to residential subdivision. The opening of a tram line from Petrie Terrace to Toowong Cemetery, via Milton Road, in July 1904, also promoted suburban development in Milton. A tram line also branched off Milton Road to run along Baroona Road, north of Milton State School.

A large number of residential estates were created in the 1880s, which soon led to pressure for a state school for Rosalie (today a locality in the suburb of Paddington, northwest of the suburb of Milton). The establishment of schools was considered an essential step in the development of early communities and integral to their success. Locals often donated land and labour for a school's construction and the school community contributed to maintenance and development. Schools became a community focus, a symbol of progress, and a source of pride, with enduring connections formed with past pupils, parents, and teachers.

The effort to open a school at Rosalie/Milton accelerated when a committee was formed in February 1886 at a meeting of residents of the Rosalie, Oxford, Bayswater, Blackall, Lewison and Holmedale Estates. A small area of high ground on the west side of Red Jacket Swamp (later Gregory Park), part of an 1884 Water Reserve, was later chosen as the site of the school. Unlike alternative sites, this land was free.

The site of Red Jacket Swamp, which was drained by Western Creek, is today bounded by Baroona Road to the north, Bayswater Street to the west, and Haig Road to the southeast. In the 1880s the swamp was located in Toowong Shire, just south of the boundary with the Ithaca Division (1879–87, then the Ithaca Shire). Land to the west and northwest of the swamp was subdivided into residential allotments in 1879; to the north in 1886–87; and to the southeast in the early 20th century. However, in the 1880s Red Jacket Swamp remained undeveloped, and was a source of contention between the two local governments about who was responsible for draining and filling it. Waste-water runoff from the houses on the higher ground (in Ithaca) around the swamp had created an odorous health hazard.

Regardless, the site was deemed suitable for a school. A 1 acre (0.40 ha) and 4 perches (100 m^{2}) Reserve for State School Purposes was surveyed off the Water Reserve in late 1886, and was gazetted in January 1887; with the remainder of Red Jacket Swamp (6 acres (2.4 ha) 3 roods 20 perches (3,500 m^{2}), gazetted as a Reserve for Recreation in July 1887.

In June 1888 the tender of James Loynes for a new state school at Rosalie, Milton, for £999, was accepted, and the first timber school building - comprising a single classroom, head teachers office, and front and back verandahs - was completed by February 1889. The Rosalie State School opened with an enrolment of 261 students on 18 March 1889, and had an enrolment of 422 by the end of the year. A second classroom was added to the north, perpendicular to the first building, by September 1889. The school soon changed its name, and the "Milton State School Committee" operated by October 1889.

The school's enrolment continued to increase, with average attendance rising to 850 by 1898. Additions were made to the school in 1891 and 1899; and two playsheds were built by early 1896.

An important component of Queensland state schools was their grounds. The early and continuing commitment to play-based education, particularly in primary school, resulted in the provision of outdoor play space and sporting facilities, such as ovals and tennis courts. Also, trees and gardens were planted to shade and beautify schools. In late 1889 Milton State School was one of the first Queensland schools to hold an Arbor Day, and 65 trees, supplied free by the Department of Agriculture and including Moreton Bay and other figs, Bauhinia, Poinciana, and Jacaranda trees, were planted by students. The aim was to beautify the school grounds, and reduce the smell of stagnant water, using shade trees.

The school grounds were gradually extended northwards along Bayswater Street. In 1901, 2 roods 0.3 perches (2,030 m^{2}) were added north of the school buildings; and another 47.2 perches (1,190 m^{2}), at the corner of Bayswater Street and Baroona Road, was added in 1920. This corner site had, from c.1892 until 1919, been the headquarters of the Milton Volunteer Fire Brigade (established 1888).

In February 1914 a swimming pool was officially opened at Milton State School, making it the second Queensland state school to have a swimming pool, after Junction Park State School in 1910. The Milton pool, funded by parents, was 40 feet (12 m) long, 16 feet (4.9 m) wide, and 3 feet 6 inches (1.07 m) to 5 feet 6 inches (1.68 m) deep. Located at the south end of the school grounds, it was built by James Price for £250. This pool was later replaced by a new reinforced concrete pool, built by Messrs William Collin & Sons and opened in November 1930. The new pool (extant in 2017) was 75 feet (23 m) long by 25 feet (7.6 m) wide, and 3 to 7 feet (0.91 to 2.13 m) deep; and cost £1206. Parents again provided most of the funding.

Improvements to the school's accommodation also continued in the interwar period, as the population of Milton expanded. A new highset wing, with three classrooms, was added at the south end of, and perpendicular to, the first school building in 1919; and another wing was added in 1923, this time at the north end of the school. The latter building had six classrooms in two storeys, and cost £2500. In 1923 the average daily attendance at the school was 900–1000 students. A 1919 newspaper article was illustrated with a photo taken from the east (rear) of the school, with the new wing "on the left". The 1923 building, with a western and northern verandah, is shown on a 1933 site plan, as the northernmost of a group of buildings connected by verandahs.

Improvements to school facilities in the 1930s included tennis courts, located in the northeast corner of Gregory Park. By this time the park had been filled in and served as the school's playground. The tennis courts were moved to their current position, east of the swimming pool, between 1951 and 1955. The tennis courts had been provided within the three years prior to February 1935. By 1909 Red Jacket Swamp had been renamed Gregory Park – after Sir Augustus Charles Gregory (1819–1905), former Commissioner for Crown Lands and Surveyor-General, Member of the Queensland Legislative Council, and a former Mayor of Toowong.

However, the main change to the school in the 1930s was the construction of a Depression-era brick school building (Block A in 2017) between 1935 and 1937. The Great Depression, commencing in 1929 and extending well into the 1930s, caused a dramatic reduction of public building work in Queensland and brought private building work to a standstill. In response, the Queensland Government provided relief work for unemployed Queenslanders, and also embarked on an ambitious and important building program to provide impetus to the economy.

Even before the October 1929 stock market crash, the Queensland Government initiated an Unemployment Relief Scheme, through a work program administered by the Department of Public Works (DPW). This included painting and repairs to school buildings. By mid-1930 men were undertaking grounds improvement works to schools under the scheme.

In June 1932 the Forgan Smith Labor Government came to power from a campaign that advocated increased government spending to counter the effects of the Depression. The government embarked on a large public building program designed to promote the employment of local skilled workers, the purchase of local building materials and the production of commodious, low maintenance buildings which would be a long-term asset to the state. The construction of substantial brick school buildings in prosperous or growing suburban areas and regional centres during the 1930s provided tangible proof of the government's commitment to remedy the unemployment situation.

Depression-era brick school buildings form a recognisable and important type, exhibiting many common characteristics. Most were designed in a classical idiom to project the sense of stability and optimism which the government sought to convey through the architecture of its public buildings. Frequently, they were two storeys above an open undercroft and built to accommodate up to 1000 students. They adopted a symmetrical plan form and often exhibited a prominent central entry. The plan arrangement was similar to that of timber buildings, being only one classroom deep, accessed by a long straight verandah or corridor. Due to their long plan forms of multiple wings, they could be built in stages if necessary; resulting in some complete designs never being realised. Classrooms were commonly divided by folding timber partitions and the undercroft was used as covered play space, storage, ablutions and other functions.

Despite their similarities, each Depression-era brick school building was individually designed by a DPW architect, which resulted in a wide range of styles and ornamental features being utilised within the overall set. These styles, which were derived from contemporary tastes and fashions, included: Arts and Crafts, typified by half-timbered gable-ends; Spanish Mission, with round-arched openings and decorative parapets; and Neo-classical, with pilasters, columns and large triangular pediments. Over time, variations occurred in building size, decorative treatment, and climatic-responsive features.

Plans of the new brick school, dated February 1935, show a long, symmetrical building of three parallel wings, comprising an undercroft with toilets and open play space, and two levels of classrooms, with teachers rooms housed in a projecting entrance bay in the centre of the main façade. The aesthetic treatment of the building incorporated Spanish Mission-style features, such as decorative parapets and semi-circular arches to the upper floor windows. The hipped roof and window hoods to the northeast facing windows were to be clad in terracotta tiles. Typical of these schools, classrooms were linearly arranged along one side of the building, linked by long corridors, and some classrooms were separated by folding timber partitions.

Construction progressed from early 1935. A description of the building by the Department of Public Works that year gave an estimated cost of £19,500, and stated:

"This building will replace the old school buildings on the existing site... The walls above the first floor will be of face brickwork, the base being formed in cement plaster... Retaining walls will be constructed on the street alignment and will provide a level area surrounding the building. The first and second floors will each contain ten classrooms, providing accommodation for 800 pupils... On each floor provisions will be made by means of folding partitions to throw four classrooms into one for assembly purposes".

Only one of the old main buildings of the school survived the construction of the Depression-era brick school building. By January 1935 the two-storey 1923 timber building (Block B in 2017) at the north end of the school was ready to be shifted further north to make way for construction of the new brick school, which was being built on the footprint of the previous school buildings. Rather than demolish Block B, as it was only 13 years old, in 1936 it was remodelled to provide vocational training (domestic science and manual training) at the school, which had been requested by the school committee. Approval for remodelling Block B for vocational training, at a cost of £913, was given in August 1936. Students from Sherwood State School were travelling to Milton for vocational training once a week, prior to 1951. Vocational education was a Queensland Government priority to support the development of primary industries; this evolved after World War I into a variety of subjects. Vocational training within primary education began in 1895 with drawing classes and expanded to include domestic sciences, agriculture, and sheet metal and wood working classes. The subjects required a variety of purpose-built facilities and were initially gender segregated. In 1936 the Minister for Education permitted students to take vocational subjects in lieu of geography or history in the Junior Examination, increasing the subjects' popularity.

The remodelling of Block B included altering the internal partitions and partially enclosing the verandahs to create woodwork and sheet metalwork rooms and a teachers room on the ground floor, and cookery, dining and dressmaking rooms, a lecture room and a laundry on the first floor. The ground floor of Block B sat lower than the undercroft level of the new brick building, and the only access to the first floor was via an L-shaped staircase on the southwest side.

The new school, with a total cost of £30,000, was in use from March 1937, and was officially opened in May by the Minister for Public Instruction, Frank Cooper. By this time 833 students were enrolled. Minister Cooper said that the new school "would stand for the next century or more".

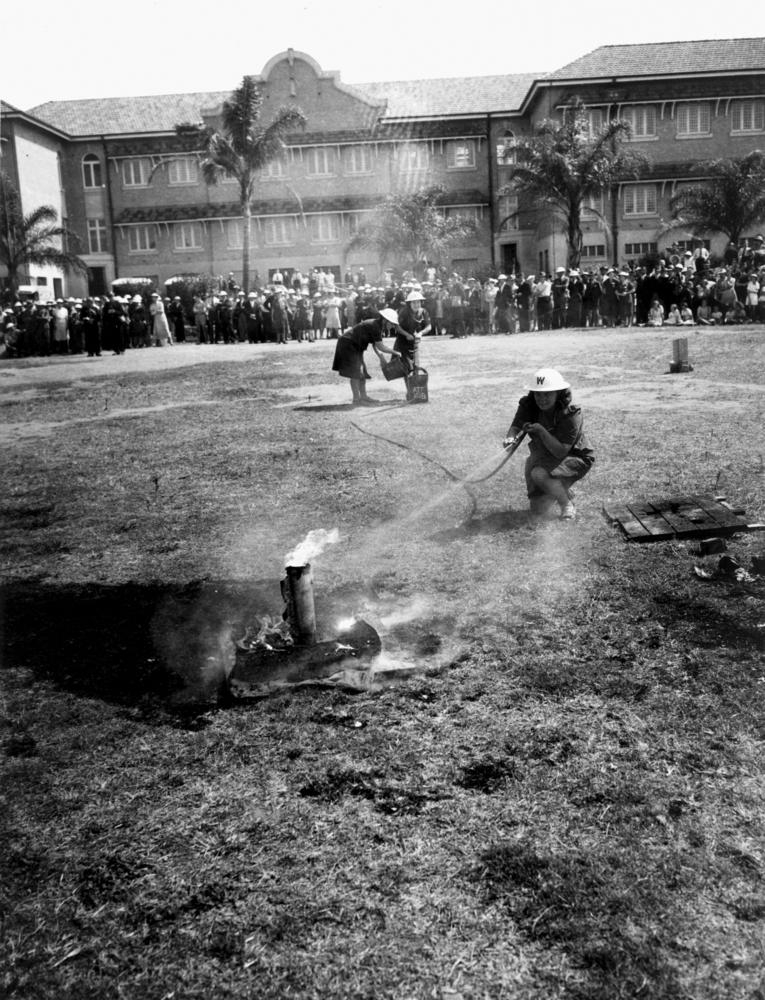
Fire fighting display outside Milton State School, circa 1942

Air raid shelters were constructed in Gregory Park, for students of Milton State School, during World War II (WWII). Due to fear of a Japanese invasion, the Queensland Government closed all coastal state schools in January 1942, and although most schools reopened on 2 March 1942, student attendance was optional until the war ended. Slit trenches, for protecting the students from Japanese air raids, were also dug at Queensland state schools. The swampy origins of Gregory Park meant that, instead of digging slit trenches, heaped sandbags were used to form six above-ground trenches, each 110 feet (34 m) long. Students, parents and staff were all involved, with women sewing the sandbags shut. However, the school had to threaten that, as they could only teach as many children as there was shelter space for, those children whose parents had assisted with the shelters would have priority to recommence attending school.

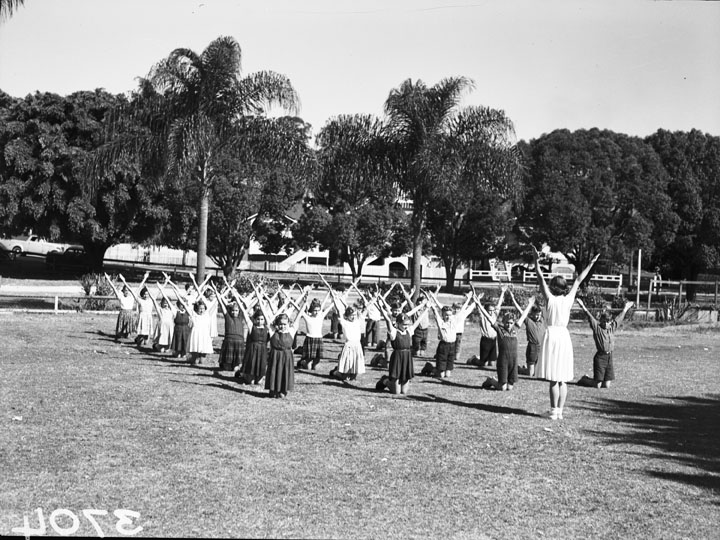
Physical education, 1951

Changes continued to be made after WWII. Although enrolments declined, from 976 in 1951, to 563 in 1973, smaller classroom sizes meant new additions were still required. In 1951, 3 roods 10 perches (3,300 m^{2}) of land was removed from Gregory Park and added to the south end of the school (the site of the tennis courts in 2017). By 1951, palm trees existed along the school's rear boundary with Gregory Park, and there were also mature trees along the northern end of the Bayswater Street frontage, and one at the south end of the school near the Haig Road pedestrian crossing. By 1960, a tree existed in front of Block A, north of the front entrance; with another just southeast of the same building. A three-classroom timber building (Block C in 2017) was added at the north end of the school by c. 1952–1955. Part of the open play space in the undercroft of Block A was also enclosed as temporary classrooms in 1957.

A timber and brick wing, with timber floor trusses, was also added to the west of the southern wing of Block A in 1959–60. This had a library on the first floor, two rooms underneath, and a verandah on the north side. The extension is visible in a 1960 aerial photograph.

By 1960 cricket practice nets existed in the very southwest corner of the school, but new nets were later built northeast of the tennis courts c. 2012–13, partly in Gregory Park. Asphalt was laid behind and in front of Block A c. 1962. In the mid-1960s Block B was altered to become a Technical College. Partitions were removed on the upper floor to create one large room with smaller rooms on the now fully enclosed verandah, while the ground floor was altered for use as an optical mechanics room and watchmakers room, with additional storage created within the verandah. Both Block B and Block C (an infant's school) apparently became surplus to requirements after Grade 8 was moved to high school (1964), and both blocks were used as technical colleges until 1973. They were later used by the Guidance Training Section for Primary and Secondary School Guidance Officers, to the end of 1988, and in 1989 were being used for aerobics classes, and by the Parents and Citizens Association, and the Arts Council. In 1991 toilets were constructed in the ground floor verandah. Around this time the dressing sheds at either end of the swimming pool were removed, and a new amenities block was built to the east of the north end of the pool.

Some minor changes were made to Block A from the late 1970s. The former cloakrooms on the first floor - by now a health room (north) and staff room (south) - were extended eastwards into the corridors of the north and south wings c. 1978, and the undercroft area of the entrance bay was also converted to three storerooms. By 1978 a tuckshop and a projection room had also been added to the southern end of the former open play area of the undercroft.

Around 2000, the classroom configurations of Block A were changed. On the first floor, one classroom wall of the southern wing was removed to form one large and one smaller classroom; while the walls between the three classrooms of the northern wing were removed to create two classrooms divided by a folding partition. The four classrooms of the central wing were converted into two classrooms divided by small rooms containing wet areas and storage. On the second floor, the three classrooms of the southern wing were converted to two classrooms divided by a folding partition. Later, a covered concrete extension was added behind Block A's central wing (c. 2008), extending east from the 1930s retaining wall.

For the school's centenary celebrations in 1989, a 1:15th scale model of first school building was built (extant 2017); a Centenary quilt was produced, and a Centenary Courtyard was created, south of the main entrance. There were 686 students enrolled in mid-2016. In 2017, Milton State School continues to operate from its original site, and its Depression-era brick school building is a local landmark. The school is important to the area as a focus for the community, and generations of students have been taught there.

== Description ==
Milton State School occupies a narrow 1.02-hectare (2.5-acre) site along Bayswater Street in the suburb of Milton, two kilometres west of the Brisbane CBD. A fence line separates the school grounds from adjacent Gregory Park to the east, which is used by the school as their playing field. The school and park occupy the full extent of a triangular block bounded by Bayswater Street to the west, Baroona Road to the north and Haig Road to the southeast. The school buildings are located along the Bayswater Street boundary at the highest point of the school grounds, which fall away to the east and southeast. The most prominent building on the site is a Depression-era brick school building (Block A, 1935–37) which fronts Bayswater Street. North of Block A is a timber building formerly used as a vocational training building (Block B, 1923, adapted 1936). The school grounds contain a number of significant mature trees, and landscaping features including retaining walls and stairs (1935–37), assembly and play areas and sporting facilities.

=== Depression-era brick school building (Block A) ===
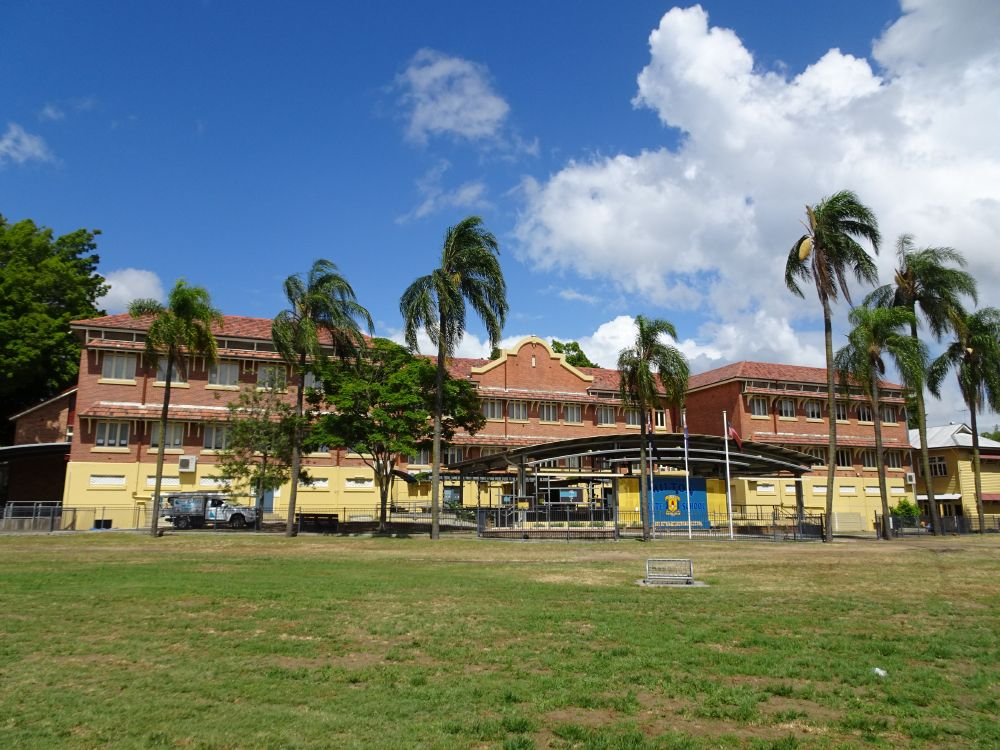
Rear of Block A from Gregory Park

The Depression-era brick school building is a long, two-storey building with a full undercroft. The building faces southwest and, as the undercroft is below the level of Bayswater Street, it is accessed via a wide walkway and steps to the main entrance in the centre of the first floor facade. Symmetrical in plan, the building comprises a long central wing with projecting entrance bay, flanked by shorter wings to the northwest and southeast, which are parallel but set back from the central wing. Secondary entrances are located at the corners of the intersecting wings, with stairs leading to first floor porticos at the front of the building, and ground floor porticos leading to the undercroft at the rear. A two-storey extension (1959–60) which adjoins the southern end of the block is not of heritage significance.

Ornamented with a Spanish Mission-style decorative treatment, the building is constructed from red face brick walls with rough-cast concrete render to the entrance bay walls and smooth render to undercroft walls, window sills and lintels, and panels below the first and second floor windows. The second floor has arched windows to the entrance bay, main façade of the central wing, and to the stairwells and corridors on the east elevation, constructed from semi-circular brick arches with brick or concrete keystones. The entrance bay features a cantilevered balcony over the main entrance door, accessed by French doors, and a decorative parapet with small louvred ventilation panel. An un-rendered version of this parapet also ornaments the northeast side of the central wing. Early iron balustrades survive on the balcony; along the entrance walkway; and to the secondary entrance stairs. The hipped roof is clad in terracotta tiles, and the raked eaves are lined with timber V-jointed (VJ) tongue and groove (T&G) boards. First and second floor windows along the northeast elevation are protected by hipped window hoods clad in terracotta tiles and featuring decorative timber brackets. The northwest and southwest end walls of the wings are largely blank. An early school bell is fixed to the underside of the first floor window hood in the centre of the northeast elevation.

Windows openings are regularly spaced and generally comprise three tall casement windows with square fanlights above. Arched windows have a fixed, semi-circular fanlight. Walls to the toilets in the undercroft have high rectangular openings which formerly contained fixed louvres in timber frames, however the glass has been removed and modern screens fixed to the outside. The main entrance double door, set back from the front façade, is a panelled, low-waisted door glazed with six-lights and retains early door hardware. The secondary entrance doors to the first floor have been replaced, but retain their original two-light fanlights with patterned glass.

Non-significant features of the exterior include: a lift attached to the northwest wall of the central wing; air-conditioning units, cables and ducting; modern downpipes and rainwater tanks; and modern doors, gates and screens to doors and windows of the undercroft.

Internally, rooms are arranged along the northeast side of the wings, linked by wide corridors along the southwest side. Vertical circulation is provided by stairwells at each end of the central wing. Next to the stairwells are rectangular rooms formerly used for play space on the undercroft level and hat and cloak rooms on the upper levels. The entrance bay contains rooms of varying size used for staff and office purposes.

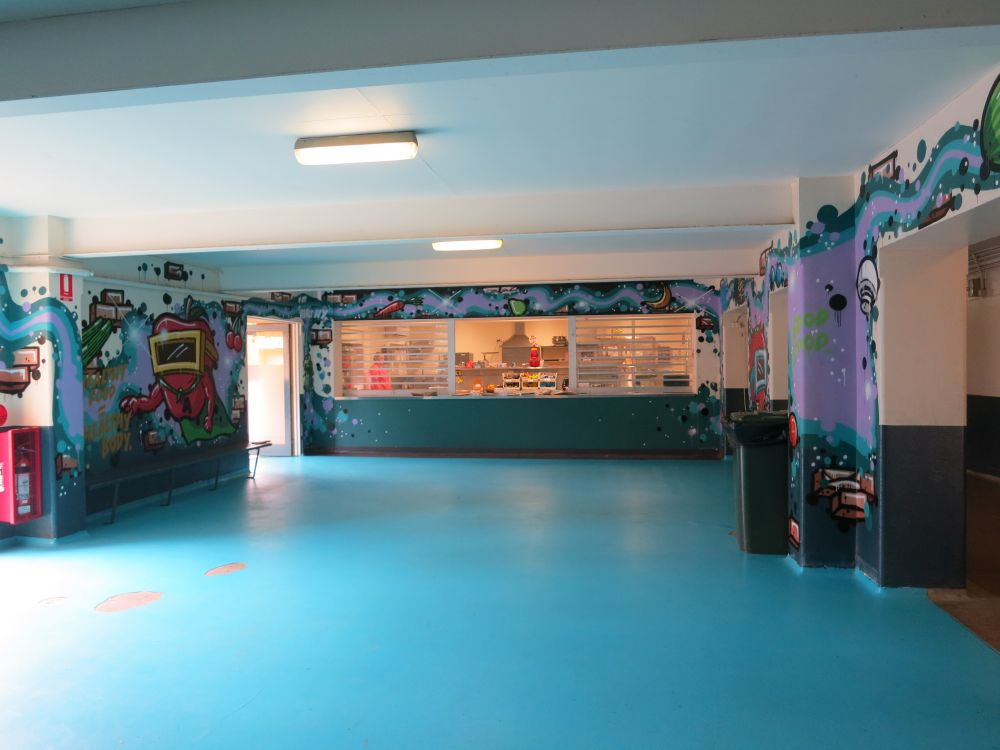
Block A undercroft, play space and tuck shop

The undercroft contains toilets in the northwest and southwest wings and was originally open play space in the central wing; however, in 2017 the southern portion of the space is enclosed for a tuck shop and music room. This level has a concrete floor with coved edges, rendered masonry walls with rounded corners, and flat rendered ceilings. The toilets largely retain their original layout; partition walls (some with high openings with wire grille infill panels); and flat-sheeted ceilings with batten cover strips. However, doors and cubicles have been replaced, new partitions inserted in places, and some areas have been converted into storage space. Spaces beneath the entrance bay and walkway from Bayswater Street have been enclosed for storage space. Early timber benches survive along some walls in the corridors and play space. Non-significant elements of the undercroft include modern partitions, windows, doors and gates.

The first and second floors originally contained ten classrooms each, but all have been enlarged by removing partitions and folding doors to merge adjacent classrooms, so that each floor has six classrooms in 2017. The former hat and cloak rooms have been merged with part of the adjacent corridor to form storage and staff rooms.

The corridors have concrete floors with coved edges, plastered walls with an inscribed moulding line at shoulder height, and flat ceilings - plastered on the first floor; lined with flat sheeting and batten cover strips on the second floor. The stairwells have concrete stairs and iron balustrades with timber top rails and square, Art Deco-style posts. A timber Roll of Honour board is fixed to the southeast wall of the first floor, central wing corridor. The board is dedicated to those who served in World War I and lists 199 names of former Milton State School students who served. An early built-in timber cupboard survives in the teachers room on the south side of the first floor main entrance.

In the classrooms, walls are generally plaster-lined with timber picture rails and lambs tongue-profile skirtings. Ceilings are lined with flat sheeting and ornamented by timber battens cover strips forming a grid pattern. Two square ceiling ventilation panels survive, one each on the second floor of the northwest and southeast wings. One set of original timber folding doors survives in the centre of the second floor central wing. The location of removed folding partitions is indicated by surviving bulkheads in other classrooms. Original timber double-hung windows with rectangular fanlights remain in the internal corridor walls. Most doors retain their rectangular fanlights. All doors on the first floor are modern replacements, apart from one set of double, part-glazed doors which have been relocated to the southeast wing (accessing the former hat room, now a cooking/staff room). Two identical doors are located on the second floor, accessing the former hat rooms. The second floor retains panelled, double doors with original hardware to most classrooms, and two early doors to the teachers rooms.

Non-significant elements of the interior include: air-conditioning units, ceiling fans, lights and other services; modern floor linings of carpet and linoleum; and modern doors, glazing, partitions and cabinetry.

=== Timber classroom building (Block B) ===
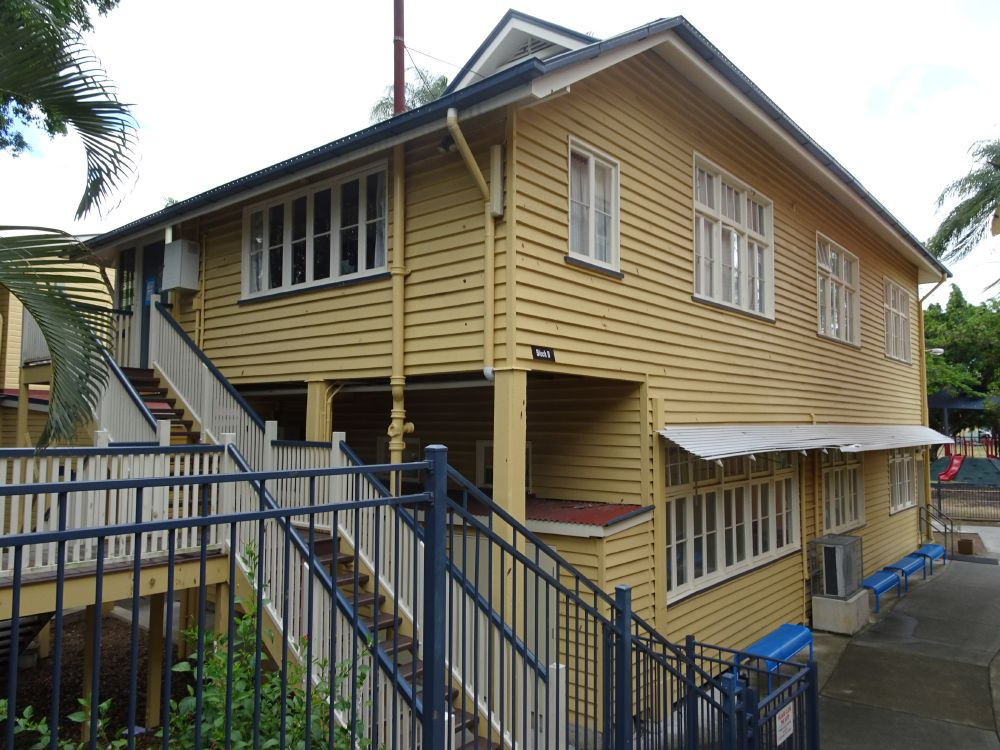
Block B from southwest

Block B is a rectangular, two storey timber building located near the northwest end of Block A. The building stands on low concrete stumps and is clad in timber weatherboards. The Dutch gable roof is clad in corrugated metal sheeting, with louvred vents to the gablets. The raked eaves have exposed rafters and are lined with timber VJ, T&G boards. A verandah, now enclosed, runs along the southwest and northwest sides of the first floor, and an enclosed verandah runs along the northwest side of the ground floor. Access to the ground floor is via a two single doors - a main entrance in the centre of the northwest wall, and a secondary entrance at the eastern end of the southeast wall. Access to the first floor is via a main timber staircase to the southwest wall, and a secondary staircase at the northern corner. Windows are generally timber-framed, two or three-light casements, with fanlights above windows in the southeast wall. Windows in the northeast walls are fanlights alone, protected by skillion-roofed hoods with decorative brackets and clad in corrugated metal sheeting. A lean-to shed clad in weatherboards runs along the southwest side of the ground floor.

The ground floor contains two rooms divided by modern folding doors. The walls and ceiling are lined with modern flat sheeting. Toilets occupy the enclosed verandah and have recently been renovated.

The first floor contains two classrooms divided by a modern concertina door, with bulkheads and lines in the ceiling lining indicating the location of former partitions. The former southwest verandah forms part of the open classroom space, and retains its raked ceiling lined with timber VJ, T&G boards. Walls are lined with flat sheeting. Two sets of early double timber doors survive, as well as the classroom ceilings of flat sheeting with timber batten cover strips, arranged in a grid pattern. The northwest verandah contains a series of small rooms and store rooms, divided by partitions from different periods. It retains it raked ceiling lined with timber VJ, T&G boards.

Non-significant elements of Block B include air-conditioning units, ceiling fans, lights and other services; modern floor linings of carpet and linoleum; the toilets fitout; and modern doors, glazing, partitions and cabinetry.

=== Grounds ===
Around Block A are a series of concrete retaining walls and stairs (1935–37) constructed to level the ground and create assembly and play spaces. A high retaining wall along Bayswater Street is topped by a concrete fence with three gateways, including a decorative wrought iron set of gates at the main entrance in front of Block A. Sections of the metal balustrades between the concrete posts have been replaced. At the northern end, this wall and fence continues perpendicular to Bayswater Street in line with the end of Block A, and incorporates a set of steps leading down towards Block B. At the southern end, the wall turns at an angle and slopes down adjacent to a concrete ramp, leading to the swimming pool level.

Between the northwest and southeast wings on the eastern side of Block A is a large rectangular concrete platform, edged by a low retaining wall and set of concrete steps on the eastern side. These steps and part of the wall are now concealed beneath a recently constructed covered play area. Modern seating and shade structures on the platform are not of heritage significance.

The school grounds contain numerous significant mature trees, including: a row of six camphor laurels (cinnamomum camphora) and a fig (likely a weeping fig, ficus benjamina) along Bayswater Street, from the Baroona Road corner; a large fig of the same species in the courtyard north of Block A's main entrance; another large fig south of Block A; a camphor laurel along the Haig Street boundary, near the corner of Bayswater Street; and rows of mature palms along the eastern school fence line, on the Gregory Park side.

Views of the park and surrounding neighbourhood can be obtained from Block A and the school grounds. Standing in an open setting, backing onto a park and framed by mature trees, Block A is a feature of the area.

== Heritage listing ==
Milton State School was listed on the Queensland Heritage Register on 28 April 2017 having satisfied the following criteria.

The place is important in demonstrating the evolution or pattern of Queensland's history.

Milton State School (established in 1889 as Rosalie State School) is important in demonstrating the evolution of state education and its associated architecture in Queensland. The place retains an excellent, representative example of a standard government-designed school building that was an architectural response to prevailing government educational philosophies.

The Depression-era brick school building, retaining walls and stairs (1935–37) are a result of the Queensland Government's building and relief work programs during the 1930s that stimulated the economy and provided work for men unemployed as a result of the Great Depression.

The 1923 timber building, adapted in 1936 for vocational training, demonstrates the pattern of relocating and re-purposing buildings at Queensland schools. It is the only surviving remnant of the earlier timber school complex at Milton State School.

The World War I Honour Board (1916) is important in demonstrating the school community's involvement in a major world event. War memorials, including honour boards, are a tribute from the community to those who served, and those who died. They are an important element of Queensland's towns and cities and are also important in demonstrating a common pattern of commemoration across Queensland and Australia.

The place is important in demonstrating the principal characteristics of a particular class of cultural places.

Milton State School is important in demonstrating the principal characteristics of a Queensland state school built during the Depression-era. These include: a large brick school building, set within a landscaped site with retaining walls, mature shade trees, assembly and play areas, and sporting facilities.

The substantial Depression-era brick school building is an example of its type. It demonstrates the principal characteristics of Depression-era Brick Schools, including: its symmetrically arranged two-storey form with an undercroft; design with ornamental features from one of a variety of styles; face brick exterior; terracotta-tiled roof; and projecting central entrance bay. The building has a linear layout, with rooms accessed by corridors, and an undercroft accommodating open play space and toilets.

The place is important because of its aesthetic significance.

Through its elegant composition of formal and decorative elements, substantial size and face brick exterior, the Depression-era brick school building at Milton State School has aesthetic significance due to its expressive attributes, by which the Department of Public Works sought to convey the concepts of progress and permanence.

The building is also significant for its streetscape contribution. Standing in an open setting adjacent to a park and framed by mature trees, it is an attractive and prominent feature of the area.

The place has a strong or special association with a particular community or cultural group for social, cultural or spiritual reasons.

Schools have always played an important part in Queensland communities. They typically retain significant and enduring connections with former pupils, parents, and teachers; provide a venue for social interaction and volunteer work; and are a source of pride, symbolising local progress and aspirations.

Milton State School has a strong and ongoing association with the Milton community. It was established in 1889 through the fundraising efforts of the local community and generations of Milton children have been taught there. The place is important for its contribution to the educational development of Milton and is a prominent community focal point.

== Notable students ==
- Neville Thiele, audio engineer
- Bert Turner, former Queensland State Member of Parliament
