= First Brisbane Burial Ground =

Heritage-listed site in Brisbane, Queensland

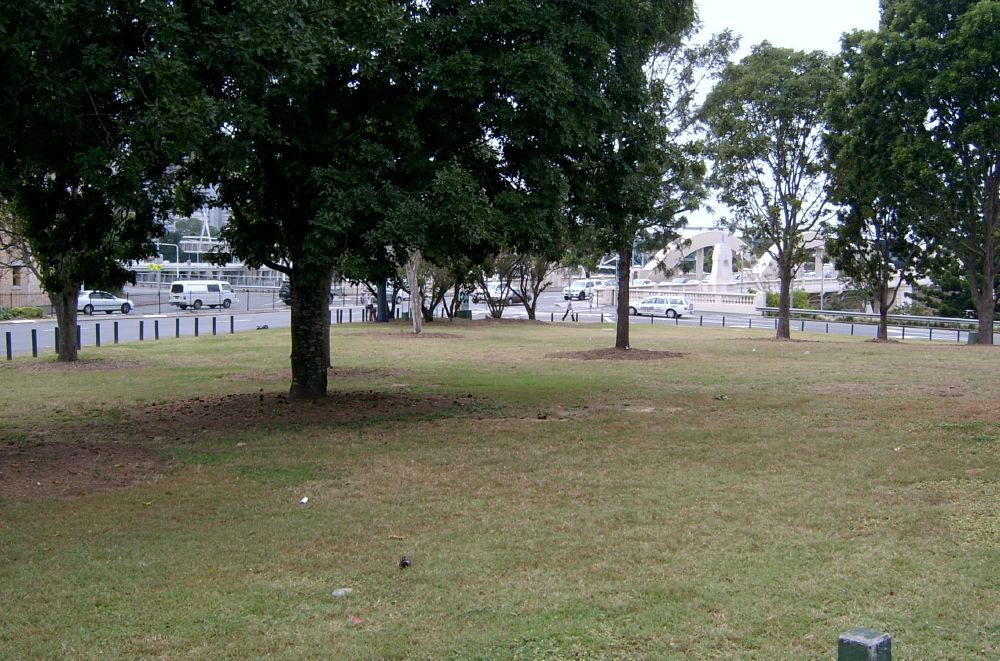
- First Brisbane Burial Ground, view from Eagle Terrace, 2010

- Location within Queensland Location within Australia
- 27.4669°S 153.0149°E
- Location: Skew Street, Brisbane City, City of Brisbane, Queensland, Australia

History
- Design period: 1824–1841 (convict settlement)

Queensland Heritage Register
- Official name: First Brisbane Burial Ground, Skew Street Cemetery
- Type: archaeological
- Designated: 16 July 2010
- Reference no.: 645609
- Significant period: 1825–1843
- Significant components: archaeological potential

The First Brisbane Burial Ground is a heritage-listed archaeological site at Skew Street, Brisbane City, City of Brisbane, Queensland, Australia. It is also known as Skew Street Cemetery. It was established in 1825 as part of the Moreton Bay penal settlement. It was added to the Queensland Heritage Register on 16 July 2010.

== History ==
The cemetery at Skew Street was established in 1825 with the relocation of the Moreton Bay Penal Settlement to Brisbane. It operated until the North Brisbane Burial Ground opened in 1843 in Paddington/Milton. During that time 265 people died in Brisbane and most were buried in the cemetery. The cemetery land was converted to freehold and auctioned in 1875. The Helidon Spa Water Company operated a factory on the land and several cottages were built. The construction of Eagle Terrace and Skew Street in the late 1800s and construction of the Grey Street Bridge in the 1920s had some impact on the site.

In May 1825 Lieutenant Henry Miller moved the Moreton Bay Settlement from the Redcliffe Peninsula to its present site on the northern bank of the Brisbane River. This was an elevated location with water holes and cooling breezes. The southern bank (Kangaroo Point Cliffs) was a cliff of rock, suitable for building material, and a fertile flood plain. The settlers faced hardship and privation and the paucity of resources combined with thick sub-tropical vegetation made settlement difficult. Between 1826 and 1829, the number of prisoners in the settlement rose from 200 to 1000 and the plight of the convicts whose labour was to establish the settlement was dire.

The site of Brisbane Town was an ongoing cause of disquiet, with Commandant Patrick Logan proposing that the settlement be moved to Stradbroke Island. However, the difficulties of crossing Moreton Bay saw this plan abandoned. Logan continued to seek alternative sites, establishing a number of outstations including Eagle Farm and Oxley Creek. Despite the continued uncertainty about the future of Brisbane Town, building had continued under Commandant Logan, who is given credit for laying out the earliest permanent foundations. Logan was responsible for the building of Brisbane's only surviving convict-constructed buildings, the Commissariat Store and the Tower Mill.

Convict numbers fell 75 percent between 1831 and 1838 by which time the area under cultivation shrank from 200 hectares (490 acres) to only 29 hectares (72 acres). On 10 February 1842 New South Wales Governor George Gipps declared Moreton Bay open for free settlement.

The cemetery was established early in the convict period and operated until the opening of the North Brisbane Burial Grounds at Paddington/Milton in 1843. During the 18 years of its operation there were 265 recorded deaths in Brisbane, including 220 convicts. Most of these people were buried in the First Brisbane Burial Ground. Probably the most famous person buried in the cemetery was the surveyor Granville William Chetwynd Stapylton who it was believed was killed by Aborigines near Mount Lindsay in May 1840. Two Aborigines were later hanged for this murder at the Tower Mill.

Following the closure of the cemetery in 1843 the area remained as unalienated crown land and in 1848 the Moreton Bay Courier described the cemetery:

"It is a disgraceful fact that, notwithstanding the repeated complaints in this journal of the exposed condition of the old burial ground, it is now as bad as ever. The temporary fencing which was placed around has almost entirely disappeared."

Four years later it was described:

"Six years ago, nearly a hundred tablets, headstones, &c., stood in the old burial ground: now a bare dozen can be counted, and many of these are dilapidated or overturned. The fence is torn down, carried away or burnt..What hands have taken so many monumental stones away none can tell."

Between 1864 and 1875 Skew Street was constructed through the cemetery land to provide vehicle access between Roma Street and North Quay. It had not been constructed by October 1864 as the Surveyor General wrote to the Secretary of Lands on 21 October 1864 that:

"The arrangement of the portion including the cemetery be deferred until some future time when the relatives and friends of those who have been interred in the cemetery may be less likely to object to the locality being appropriated as a public thoroughfare."

In October 1875 the cemetery land was divided into 7 town allotments varying in size from 12 to 27.5 perches (300 to 700 m^{2}) and sold at public auction as Section 41. The sale of the land was specifically to raise funds for the provision of drainage facilities within Brisbane. The purchasers were F. Giles, J. Carmody, Dr John Waugh and H. Morwitch. Section 41 was described as:

"The triangular reserve (formerly a burial ground) between the North Quay, Eagle Cliff (or Terrace), and Skew Street (running from opposite the old entrance to the gaol to the North Quay)."

Dr John Waugh arrived in Brisbane in the early 1860s and originally practiced in Stanley Street but later moved his practice to the brick cottage he constructed on this newly acquired land. He was president of the Royal Geographical Society of Queensland for many years.

In 1881 at least three burials were exhumed from the cemetery and removed with their monuments to the Toowong Cemetery. These were all the remains of children who had died at the convict settlement. They were William Roberts, 5 years 2 months old son of Charles Roberts of the Commissariat Department who died in 1831, Peter Macauley, 15 years and 8 months old son of Private Peter Macauley of the 17th Regiment of Foot who died in 1832, and Jane Pittard the 12 month old daughter of Colour Sergeant John Pittard of the 57th Regiment of Foot who died in 1833.

By the 1890s the Helidon Spa Water Company had established a factory on the allotments at the North Quay end of Section 41. Construction of the Grey Street Bridge in the 1920s resulted in resumption of properties and the realignment of roadways at the northern access to the bridge.

== Description ==
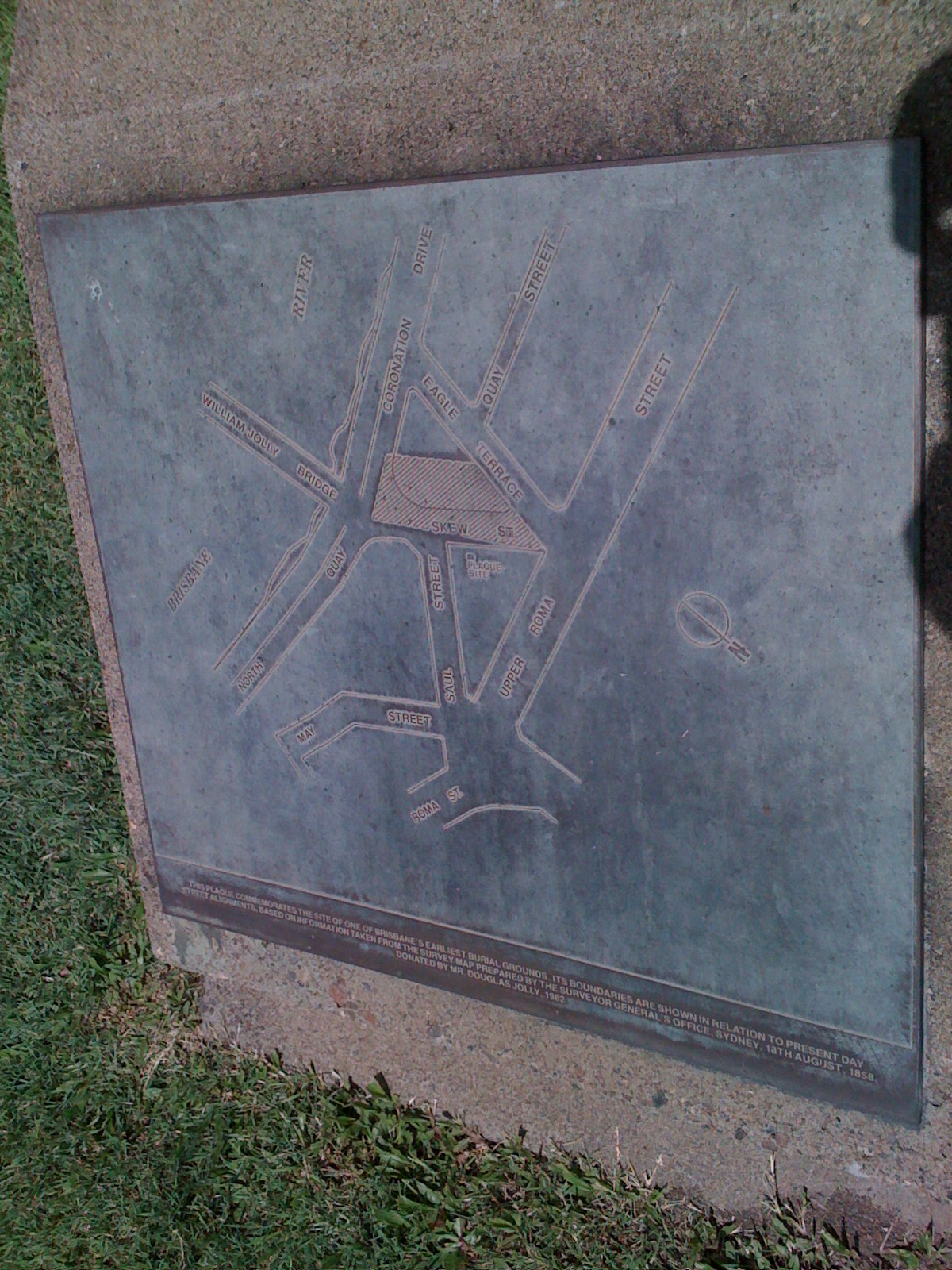
Plaque showing a map of the First Brisbane Burial Ground, 2009

The first European burial ground in Queensland is located beneath unnamed open space bounded by and including Skew Street, Eagle Terrace and North Quay, Brisbane. Although there is no surface evidence of the burial ground, the documented history and an understanding of the previous usage of the area, particularly a lack of major development, indicates potential for both human remains and archaeological artefacts to exist within the place.

The former burial ground is believed to have comprised the majority of today's Lot 1 on RP177960. In April 2010, this was public open space. None of the installed bollards delineating the open space area, vehicular access barriers or plantings and gardens are of archaeological importance or potential.

The physical limits of service easements ARP165780, BRP165780, CRP165780 and DRP165780, which cross the middle of the open space area from near the intersection of North Quay and Skew Street northwest across Eagle Terrace to Quay Street, are excluded due to previous subsurface disturbance, notably in November 2009, which would have destroyed any surviving archaeological remains within the limits of those easements.

The site includes parts of Eagle Terrace and Skew Street. Subsurface areas below the base construction layer of the current road surface are of potential archaeological importance.

== Heritage listing ==
First Brisbane Burial Ground was listed on the Queensland Heritage Register on 16 July 2010 having satisfied the following criteria.

The First Brisbane Burial Ground is an important aspect of Queensland's history as the first European burial ground in Queensland. At least 220 convicts, soldiers, women and children are known to have been interred in the burial ground, accounting for most of the people who died in the Moreton Bay Penal Settlement between 1825 and 1843.

Physical evidence of the Moreton Bay Penal Settlement is now rare. Human remains and associated material culture, including personal items, have potential to survive subsurface at the First Brisbane Burial Ground. Development on the site beginning in the 1870s (construction of Skew Street and subdivision has been low impact and unlikely to have had a major detrimental impact on the preservation of human remains and material culture or their potential for survival. The capping of the site by road construction from the 1870s and residential and commercial development (single storey cottages and the Helidon Spa Water Company) in the 1880s is likely to have had a positive effect on site preservation.

The archaeological integrity and potential for site preservation of the First Brisbane Burial Ground is high. Excavations at the nearby North Brisbane Burial Ground (1843–1875) in the early 2000s demonstrate that burials and their associated material culture survive in the Brisbane clays close to the river. The First Brisbane Burial Ground has not been subjected to the extreme levels of post-depositional contamination that occurred at the North Brisbane Burial Ground.

The site has been assessed in the Brisbane City CBD Archaeological Plan as being "exceedingly rare" given its association with the penal settlement phase of Brisbane. The level of disturbance has been designated as "intact" given the minor nature of road and other activities undertaken, and the lack of any major building construction work at the site. This combination of being designated "exceedingly rare" and "intact" leads to the categorisation of the site as having "Exceptional Research Potential" in the Brisbane City CBD Archaeological Plan.

Archaeological investigations on the site have the potential to answer important research questions about Queensland's history relating to the importation of materials, decay processes, colonial burial practices, gender, class and denominational differences, differential treatment of officers, soldiers, convicts and civilians, and health, nutrition and causes of death in the early colony.
