= Milton railway station, Brisbane =

Railway station in Queensland, Australia

Milton
- Inbound view in September 2026

General information
- Location: Milton Road, Milton
- Coordinates: 27.4689°S 153.0052°E
- Elevation: 9 m (30 ft)
- Owner: Queensland Rail
- Operator: Queensland Rail
- Lines: T1 Ipswich/Rosewood; T2 Springfield Central
- Distance: 2.25 kilometres from Central
- Platforms: 4 (2 side, 1 island)

Construction
- Structure type: Ground
- Accessible: Yes

Other information
- Status: Staffed
- Station code: 600279 (platform 1); 600280 (platform 2); 600281 (platform 3); 600282 (platform 4)
- Fare zone: Zone 1
- Website: Queensland Rail

History
- Opened: 1884; 142 years ago
- Rebuilt: 1960; 66 years ago

Services
Preceding station	Queensland Rail	Following station
Roma Street towards Caboolture, Nambour or Gympie North	Ipswich/Rosewood line	Auchenflower towards Ipswich or Rosewood
Roma Street towards Kippa-Ring	Springfield Central line	Auchenflower towards Springfield Central
Location

Milton is a railway station operated by Queensland Rail on the Ipswich/Rosewood and Springfield lines. It opened in 1884 and serves the Brisbane suburb of Milton. It is a ground level station, featuring one island platform with two faces and two side platforms.

== History ==
Milton station opened in 1884. The station was rebuilt in 1960 as part of the quadruplication of the line.

In June 2010, the Queensland Government approved mixed-use development at Milton station, which saw Platform 1 rebuilt and a mixed-use office and apartment building constructed adjacent to the station.

== Services ==
Milton is served by City network services operating from Nambour, Caboolture, Kippa-Ring and Bowen Hills to Springfield Central, Ipswich and Rosewood.

== Platforms and services ==
Milton platform arrangement
Platform	Line	Destination	Notes
1	T1 Ipswich/Rosewood	Ipswich or Rosewood	
1	T2 Springfield Central	Springfield Central	
2	T1 Ipswich/Rosewood	Roma Street (to Caboolture and Nambour/Gympie North lines)	
2	T2 Springfield Central	Roma Street (to Kippa-Ring line)	
3	T1 Ipswich/Rosewood	Ipswich or Rosewood	
4	T1 Ipswich/Rosewood	Roma Street (to Caboolture and Nambour/Gympie North lines)	
4	T2 Springfield Central	Roma Street (to Kippa-Ring line)	
