= Auchenflower railway station =

Railway station in Queensland, Australia

Auchenflower
- Station entrance in September 2026

General information
- Location: Auchenflower Terrace, Auchenflower
- Coordinates: 27°28′34″S 152°59′49″E
- Owner: Queensland Rail
- Operator: Queensland Rail
- Lines: T1 Ipswich/Rosewood; T2 Springfield Central
- Distance: 3.46 kilometres from Central
- Platforms: 4 (2 side, 1 island)

Construction
- Structure type: Ground
- Accessible: Assisted

Other information
- Status: Staffed
- Station code: 600283 (platform 1); 600284 (platform 2); 600285 (platform 3); 600286 (platform 4)
- Fare zone: Zone 1
- Website: Queensland Rail

History
- Opened: 1887; 139 years ago
- Rebuilt: 1960; 66 years ago

Services
| Preceding station | Queensland Rail | Following station |
|---|---|---|
| Milton towards Caboolture, Nambour or Gympie North | Ipswich/Rosewood line | Toowong towards Ipswich or Rosewood |
| Milton towards Kippa-Ring | Springfield Central line | Toowong towards Springfield Central |
Location

Auchenflower is a railway station operated by Queensland Rail on the Ipswich/Rosewood and Springfield lines. It opened in 1887 and serves the Brisbane suburb of Auchenflower. It is a ground level station, featuring one island platform with two faces and two side platforms.

== History ==
Auchenflower station opened in 1887. The station was rebuilt in 1960 as part of the quadruplication of the line.

In the early 2020s the station was upgraded to provide elevators, wheelchair accessible raised platforms (in the centre) and a new overpass. The original overpass was removed following the opening of the new footbrige.

== Services ==
Auchenlower is served by Citytrain network services operating from Nambour, Caboolture, Kippa-Ring and Bowen Hills to Springfield Central, Ipswich and Rosewood.

== Platforms and services ==
Auchenflower platform arrangement
| Platform | Line | Destination | Notes |
|---|---|---|---|
| 1 | T1 Ipswich/Rosewood | Ipswich or Rosewood | |
| 1 | T2 Springfield Central | Springfield Central | |
| 2 | T1 Ipswich/Rosewood | Roma Street (to Caboolture and Nambour/Gympie North lines) | |
| 2 | T2 Springfield Central | Roma Street (to Kippa-Ring line) | |
| 3 | T1 Ipswich/Rosewood | Ipswich or Rosewood | |
| 4 | T1 Ipswich/Rosewood | Roma Street (to Caboolture and Nambour/Gympie North lines) | |
| 4 | T2 Springfield Central | Roma Street (to Kippa-Ring line) | |
