= Auchenflower =

- Suburb
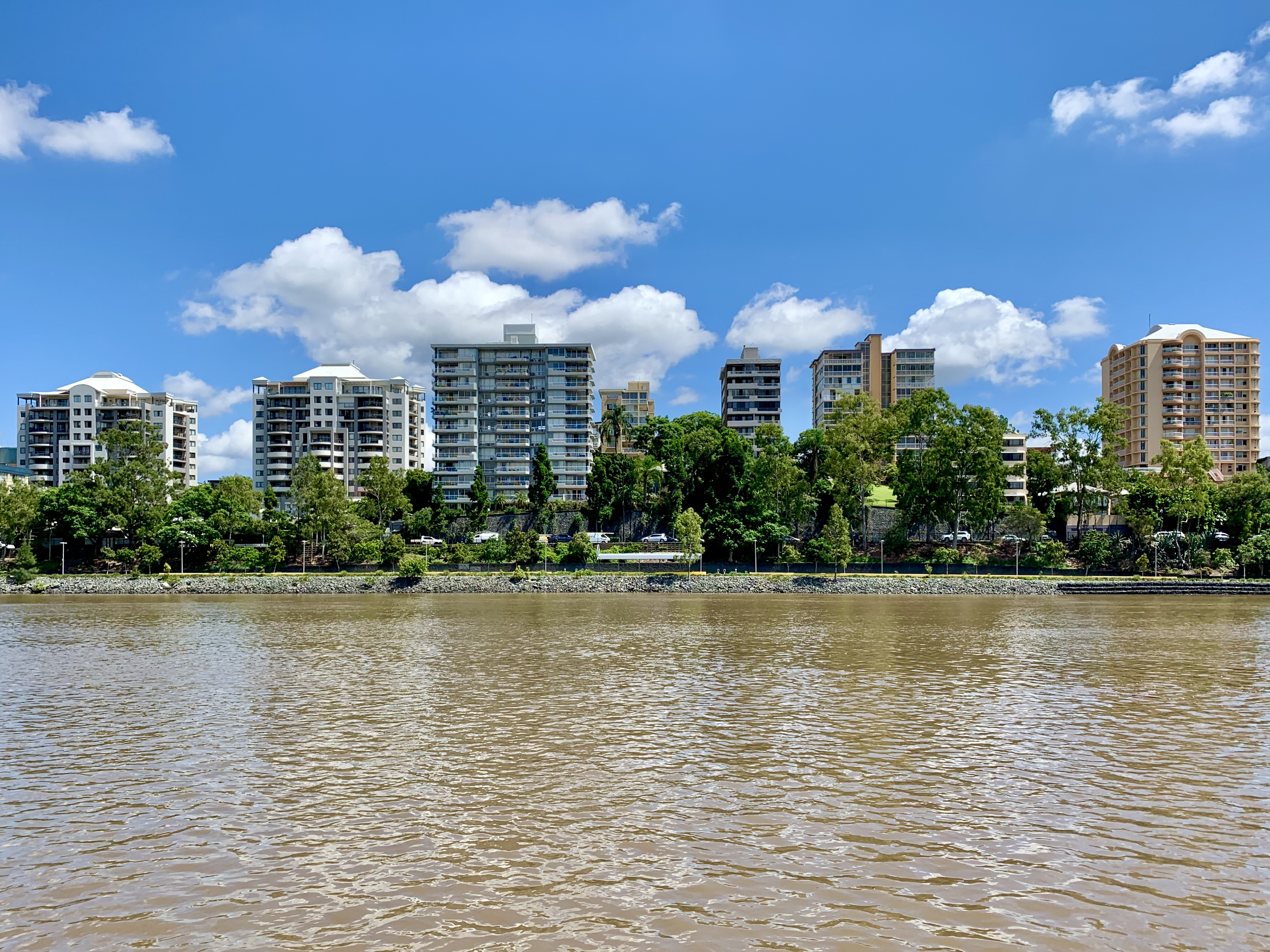
- Auchenflower seen from the Brisbane River

- Interactive map of Auchenflower
- Coordinates: 27.4733°S 152.9938°E
- Country: Australia
- State: Queensland
- City: Brisbane
- LGA: City of Brisbane (Paddington Ward)
- Location: 4.4 km (2.7 mi) SW of Kelvin Grove; 4.5 km (2.8 mi) NE of Indooroopilly; 4.8 km (3.0 mi) W of Brisbane CBD

Government
  - State electorates: Maiwar; Cooper
  - Federal division: Ryan

Area
  - Total: 1.5 km^{2} (0.58 sq mi)

Population
  - Total: 6,053 (2021 census)
  - Density: 4,040/km^{2} (10,500/sq mi)
- Time zone: UTC+10:00 (AEST)
- Postcode: 4066
Suburbs around Auchenflower
Bardon	Paddington	Milton
Toowong	Auchenflower	Milton
Toowong	Toowong	West End

Auchenflower /ˈɔːkənflaʊ.ər/ is an inner western riverside suburb of the City of Brisbane, Queensland, Australia. In the 2021 census, Auchenflower had a population of 6,053 people.

== Geography ==
Auchenflower is located 2.5 kilometres (1.6 mi) west of the Brisbane CBD bordering the Brisbane River. The area features a hilly terrain and pockets of green spaces, offering residents scenic views and recreational opportunities.

== History ==
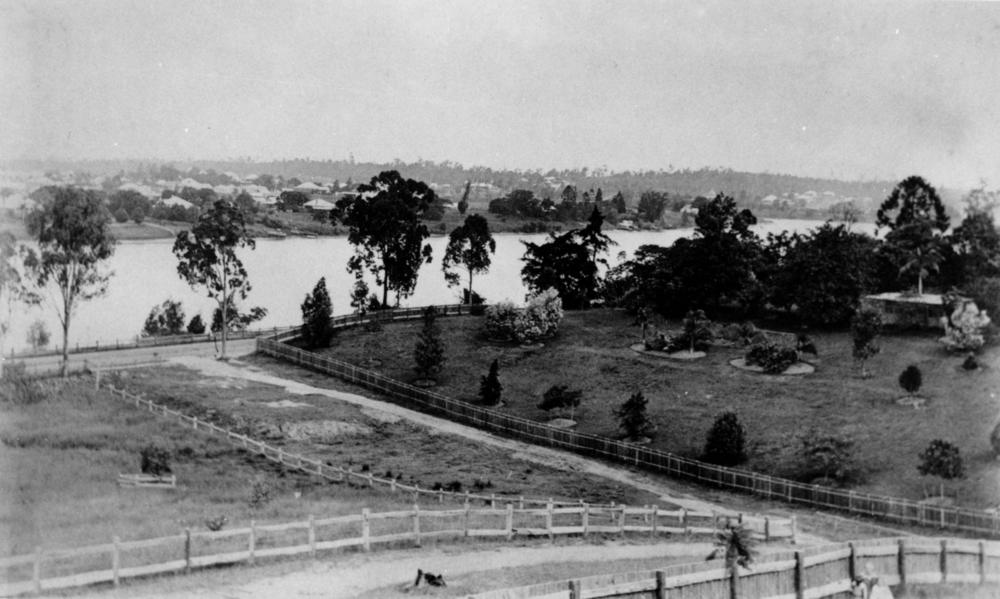
Looking southward across the Brisbane River from Auchenflower across Chasely Street to West End around 1910

The area was formerly populated by rural estates. One of which was named Auchenflower by Thomas McIlwraith circa 1880. The suburb takes its name from that estate. The name Auchenflower is a Gaelic word meaning field of flowers, namely Achadh nan Flùr.

Between 1900 and 1962, Auchenflower was served by trams running along Milton Road from Toowong. The services were withdrawn after the disastrous Paddington tram depot fire.

In June 1887, the Torwood Estate was available for sale on the ground by R. J. Cottell, Auctioneer. The location was advertised as "Torwood adjoins Baroona, is close to Rosalie, to Bayswater, to Milton to Castlemaine Brewery, and is within 10 minutes drive of the city on a tip-top road."

In May 1920, "Drysllwyn Estate" made up of 37 allotments was advertised to be auctioned by Cameron Bros, auctioneers. A map advertising the auction states that the Estate is opposite the residence "Drysllwyn" and near Auchenflower Railway Station.

In September 1921, "Chermside Park, second section" made up of 50 allotments was advertised to be auctioned by Cameron Bros, auctioneers. A map advertising the auction states that the estate is convenient to the Toowong tram line.

Auchenflower Infants' Provisional School opened on 30 January 1922. It closed in 1960.

St Alban the Martyr Anglican Church was dedicated by Archbishop Gerald Sharp on 18 November 1923. In 1954 the foundation stone for a new church building was laid by Archbishop Philip Strong. The church's deconsecration and closure in 2015 was approved by Local Bishop Godfrey Fryar. The site is being redeveloped for residential apartments.

In 1975, the first NightOwl convenience store was opened at 392 Milton Road (27.4739°S 152.9956°E).

From 1975 to 1986, Auchenflower was officially a neighbourhood with the suburb of Toowong, but obtained independent suburb status on 16 November 1986.

In January 2011, Auchenflower experienced flooding as part of the 2010–2011 Queensland floods.

== Demographics ==
In the 2016 census, Auchenflower had a population of 5,870 people, 50% female and 50% male. The median age of the Auchenflower population was 31 years of age, 7 years below the Australian median. 67.9% of people were born in Australia., compared to the national average of 66.7; the next most common countries of birth were England 3.2%, New Zealand 2.9%, India 2.2% and China 1.8%. 77.0% of people only spoke English at home. Other languages spoken at home included Mandarin at 2.1%. The most common responses for religion were No Religion 38.5% and Catholic 21.4%.

In the 2021 census, Auchenflower had a population of 6,053 people.

== Heritage listings ==
Auchenflower has a number of heritage-listed sites, including:

- Raymont Lodge, 45 Cadell Street
- Moorlands, 451 Coronation Drive (now within the grounds of the Wesley Hospital)
- McIlwraith Croquet Club, 21 Dixon Street

== Education ==
There are no schools in Auchenflower. The nearest government primary schools are Milton State School in neighbouring Milton to the north-east, Rainworth State School in neighbouring Bardon to the north-west, and Toowong State School in neighbouring Toowong to the south-west. The nearest government secondary schools are Kelvin Grove State College in Kelvin Grove to the north-east and Indooroopilly State High School in Indooroopilly to the south.

== Facilities ==
The Wesley Hospital is a private hospital at 451 Coronation Drive, but its main entry is on Chasely Street (27.47732°S 152.99819°E). It extends west through to the Auchenflower railway station on the Ipswich railway line.

Auchenflower Stadium (also known as NAB Stadium), previously known as The Auchendome, is a basketball centre in Auchenflower, Queensland.

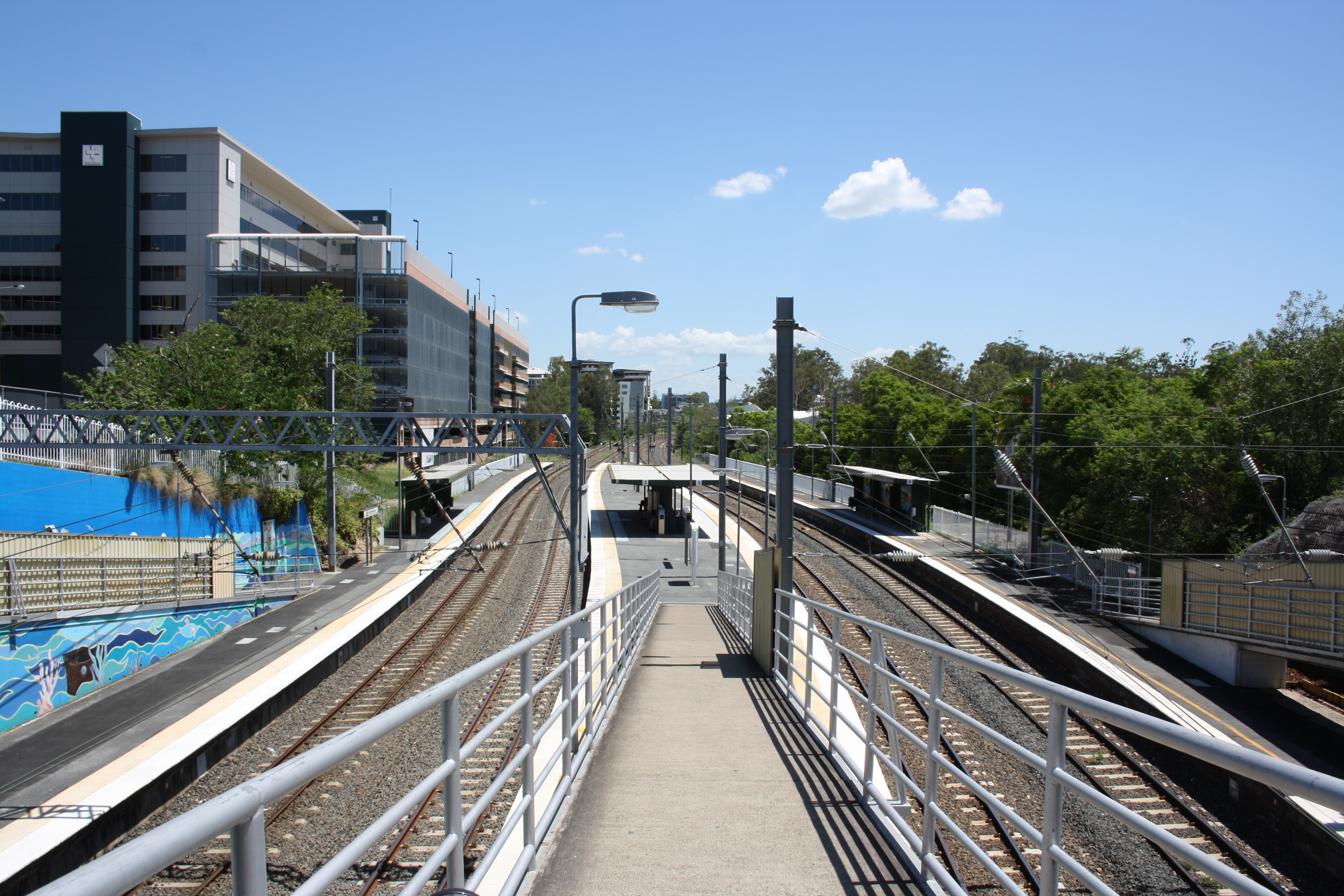
Auchenflower railway station

== Transport ==
- By train: the Auchenflower railway station is the second station on the Ipswich line west of Roma Street railway station.
- By bus: Auchenflower is served by most western suburb bus routes operated by Transport for Brisbane.
- By road: Auchenflower has two main roads through the suburb, Coronation Drive and Milton Road, both running from the Brisbane CBD towards the western suburbs.
- By bicycle: the Bicentennial Bikeway runs along the Brisbane River providing access from the Brisbane CBD through to Toowong.
