= Milton House, Milton =

Milton House
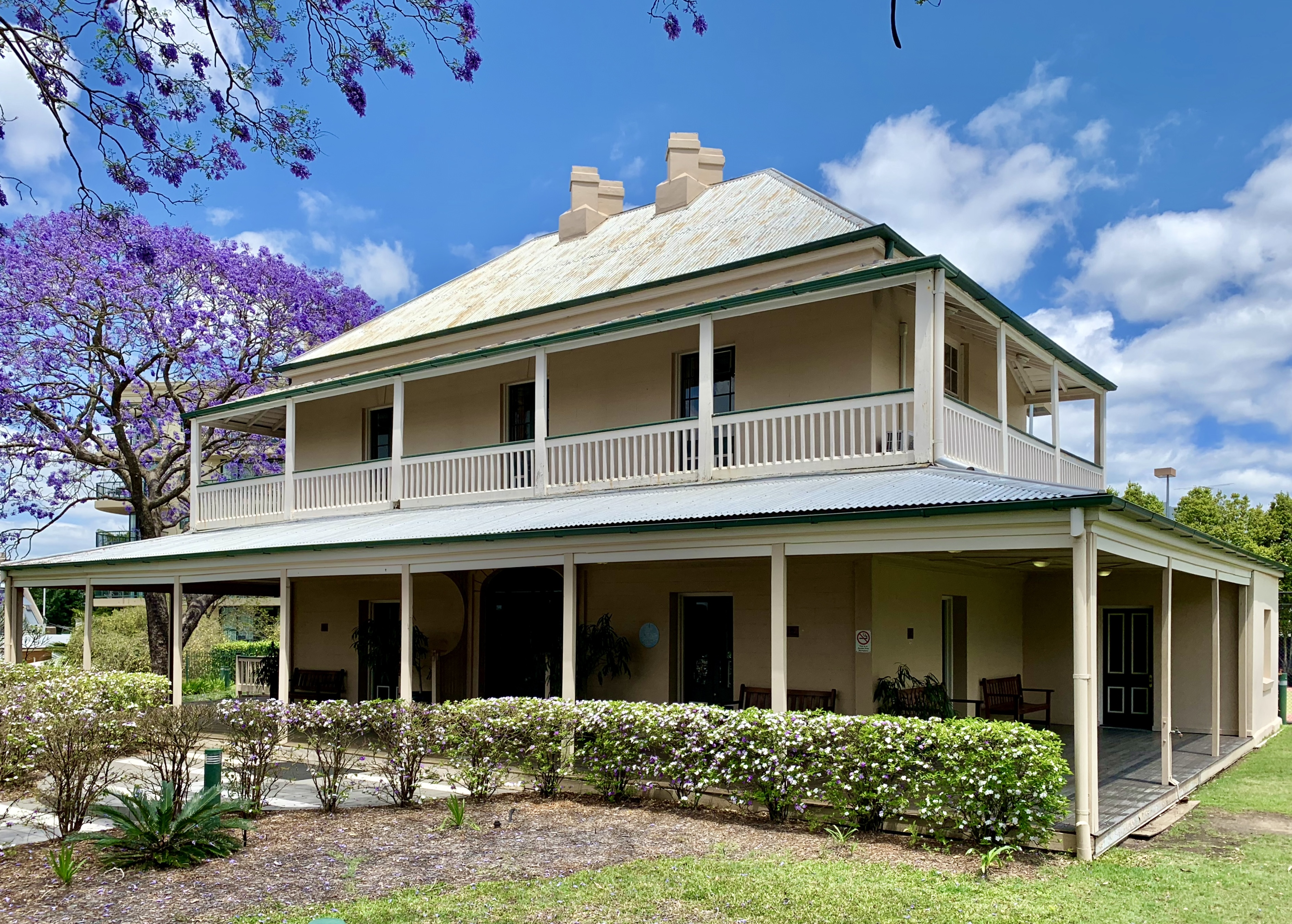
- Milton House, 2009

- Location within Queensland Location within Australia
- 27.4717°S 153.0058°E
- Location: 50 McDougall Street, Milton, City of Brisbane, Queensland, Australia

History
- Design period: 1840s–1860s (mid-19th century)
- Built: c. 1852–1922

Site notes
- Architectural style: Colonial Georgian

Queensland Heritage Register
- Official name: Milton House
- Type: state heritage (built)
- Designated: 21 October 1992
- Reference no.: 600253
- Significant period: 1850s–1860s, 1920s (fabric); 1850s–1880s
- Significant components: residential accommodation – main house, views from, cellar, views to

Milton House is a heritage-listed villa at 50 McDougall Street, Milton, City of Brisbane, Queensland, Australia. It was built from c. 1852. It was added to the Queensland Heritage Register on 21 October 1992.

== History ==
Milton House was erected in 1852 or 1853 for retired Queen Street chemist Ambrose Eldridge. It was the first substantial house in the area and soon a local landmark, being prominent in early views of Brisbane. It was the base for Eldridge's experimental farming when the Moreton Bay region was struggling to establish itself, and later for John Frederick McDougall's considerable pastoral holdings in the area.

Ambrose Eldridge was a Sydney chemist who arrived in Moreton Bay in late July 1847 to work in John Taggart's Medical Hall, a chemist shop in Queen Street. Taggart sold the business to Eldridge, who took over from 1 October 1849, and developed the business as a chemist, druggist, oilman, and grocer.

In the late 1840s and 1850s, Eldridge adopted an active and enthusiastic role in the development of Brisbane and Queensland. He was prominent in the Separation movement and served on a wide variety of local committees (for most of which he was a founding member), including those of the Hospital, the proposed Brisbane Market (1851), the Moreton Bay Steam Navigation Company, the Moreton Bay Horticultural Society, the Brisbane Exchange, the Northern Districts Agricultural and Pastoral Association, the Moreton Bay Immigration and Land Company (first chairman of directors in 1855–56), and the Moreton Bay Building Society, which was dissolved in 1854 to re-emerge as the Moreton Bay Permanent Investment and Building Society in 1855. He was active in promoting local issues such as a bridge over Breakfast Creek, a committee to communicate between the electors of Moreton Bay and their representative in the New South Wales Legislative Council in Sydney, a survey of the Brisbane River entrance and bar, direct emigration to Moreton Bay, government funding to churches, and regularly subscribed to rewards for the discovery of gold in the Moreton and Darling Downs districts. He was a prominent member of St John's Anglican Church, and an active participant in the Brisbane School of Arts and Sciences and the Moreton Bay Musical Society. During the early 1850s his business flourished and he acquired a number of Brisbane town and suburban allotments.

Eldridge was a well-respected townsman with a clear commitment to the development of Brisbane at political, civic, economic and social levels, but he was also something of a visionary. Like the indomitable Dr John Dunmore Lang, who envisioned a Moreton Bay populated by yeomen farmers, Eldridge was determined to prove that agriculture in the Northern Districts of New South Wales was economically viable.

In the second half of 1851, Eldridge, who had little knowledge of farming, purchased Western Suburban Allotments 4 to 11, totalling over 30 acres (12 ha), along the northern bank of the Brisbane River, just beyond the town boundary. Here, at what he named Milton Farm, Eldridge experimented with cotton growing, hoping to prove that agriculture at Moreton Bay could be sustained and profitable. Whilst not the only Moreton Bay resident to experiment with cotton-growing at the time, he was initially one of the most successful.

Cotton was a logical crop with which to experiment – it was one of the principal import of Great Britain, and an important basis of her manufacturing industry, and if grown successfully at Moreton Bay, would ensure the prosperity of the Northern Districts of New South Wales, and enhance local aspirations for Separation. By September 1852, five acres of the Milton land had been cleared, and were planted the following month with seeds of the finest Sea Island Cotton. At the close of 1852, Eldridge retired from business, selling the Medical Hall and devoting his time to the Milton experiment. It is likely that Milton House was erected about this time. By June 1853 the first crop of Milton cotton was being picked, yielding at least 20 bales. Eldridge reported in the local press that, not including the cost of land and land clearing, he had expended £38 in the experiment, and had made a profit of £14. That December he was awarded first prize of £30 by the New South Wales Government, for samples of the cotton sent to Sydney in a government-sponsored competition. Two years later he sent samples of the Milton cotton to the Paris Exhibition of 1855, where it was highly acclaimed.

In 1853, Eldridge expanded his efforts to promote profitable local farming, taking up on long lease approximately 400 acres (160 ha) at Eagle Farm. By late 1854 this land had been cleared, and in March 1855, Eldridge announced his intention of removing to Eagle Farm, and selling the Milton Estate. The Eldridges resided at Milton through the remainder of 1855, but the property, including a mansion house was sold and transferred to pastoralist John Frederick McDougall in January 1856, for £2,300.

For Eldridge, the move spelt disaster. The experiments at Eagle Farm appear to have failed, and by 1859 he had returned to the chemist business, opening a shop at Ipswich. He died in 1860, leaving his family penniless.

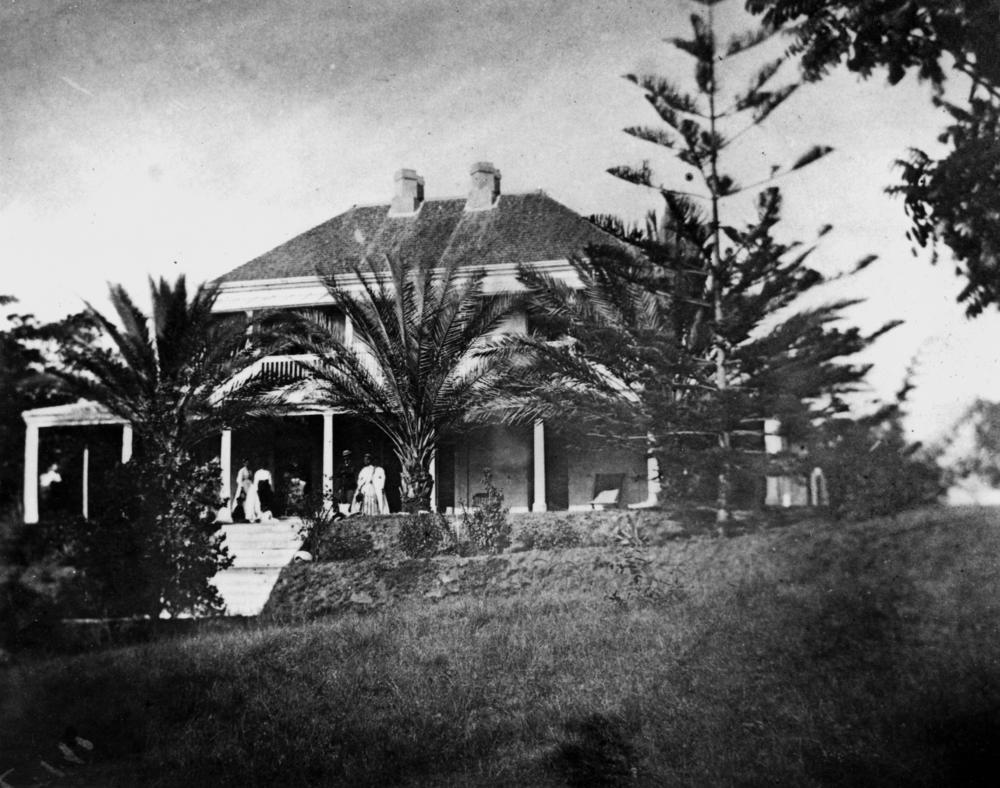
Manning family on the steps of Milton House, 1868

John Frederick McDougall, a member of the first Queensland Legislative Council, farmed the Milton Estate, adding large western suburbs leaseholds to his holding, and enlarging the house considerably. From 1864 the McDougalls resided at Rosalie Station and let Milton. Tenants included Arthur Manning, the Colonial Under-Secretary; Henry Walsh, MLC and speaker of the Legislative Assembly; and James Crombie. The house gave its name to the local suburb, while neighbouring Rosalie took its name from McDougall's Darling Downs property, bearing testament to the one time extent of his holdings in the western suburbs.

Milton Farm was sold to the Queensland Investment and Land Mortgage Co. Ltd in 1885 and subdivided for residential development, at which time the newly created streets of McDougall, Manning, Walsh and Crombie were named after previous owners or occupiers of Milton House. The Commissioner of Police, David Thompson Seymour, bought an area of nearly two acres, including the house, in 1887, but sold it the next year to Dr Hugh Bell, a noted physician and consultant at the Brisbane General Hospital for forty years. In 1904 the property was purchased by grain merchant William Siemon and his family, who renovated the premises in 1922. In 1955 the Siemon family gave the property to the Presbyterian Church, which used Milton House as a hostel for women college students until 1983. The building subsequently became part of the Kings Row Corporate Park development, at which time it was refurbished to resemble its outward appearance of the 1860s.

== Description ==
The hip-roofed house is Colonial Georgian in style and plan, having a typical front doorway with segmented sidelights and an arched fanlight, and a symmetrical arrangement of rooms about a central hallway on each floor. The ground floor has wide, open verandahs on three sides. Two service rooms run across the rear of the core, incorporating pavilion wings of the side verandahs.

The walls are of brick, which is lime rendered and jointed to give the impression of stone. A three-roomed cellar is constructed of rough rubble walling, and entered by steps on the south side of the verandah. The roof shingles have been replaced with corrugated iron.

Internally, the narrow cedar staircase has shaped handrails and stick-balusters (replacements), the vestibule features an ornate plaster ceiling, and the dining room has an early 20th century pressed metal ceiling. The first floor, with narrow stick-balustraded verandahs on three sides, originally accommodated bedrooms. These verandahs are accessed by French doors, though the louvred shutters have not been reinstated. Fireplaces remain in the ground floor rooms but have been enclosed upstairs. They lead to dominant chimney-stacks which are set diagonally to the ridge of the wide hipped roof.

Milton House was originally built as a homestead, high on the riverbank overlooking the surrounding property. Photographs taken in the 1860s show a line of palms between two Norfolk Island pines and a pathway edged with shrubbery leading down towards the river. All of these plantings seem to have disappeared by the 1950s. The present garden and lawns to the front and sides of the house were planted at the time of the building's refurbishment but include mature poinciana and jacaranda trees. The rear of the house opens onto a newly built tennis court, swimming pool and outdoor entertaining area. The river facade can be glimpsed from Coronation Drive, framed by modern office blocks.

== Heritage listing ==
Milton House was listed on the Queensland Heritage Register on 21 October 1992 having satisfied the following criteria.

The place is important in demonstrating the evolution or pattern of Queensland's history.

Milton House is important in demonstrating the evolution of Queensland's history, being associated with important early agricultural experimentation in pre-separation Queensland, associated with the pastoral development of the western suburbs prior to closer settlement in the 1860s and as one of the oldest surviving houses in Brisbane and the first substantial house in the western suburbs.

The place demonstrates rare, uncommon or endangered aspects of Queensland's cultural heritage.

Milton House demonstrates rare aspects of Queensland's cultural heritage, being one of the few surviving pre-Separation houses in Brisbane, numbered with Newstead House, Bulimba House and Shafston House and as a rare example of 1850s Colonial Georgian architecture in Brisbane.

The place is important in demonstrating the principal characteristics of a particular class of cultural places.

Milton House survives sufficiently in form, feature and material, to be important in demonstrating the principal features of Colonial Georgian architecture adapted to local climatic conditions, notably through the inclusion of verandahs and French doors on three sides.

The place has a strong or special association with a particular community or cultural group for social, cultural or spiritual reasons.

Milton House has a special association with the local community with the house giving its name to the local suburb, with the neighbouring suburb of Rosalie perpetuating the association with the second owner of Milton House, JF McDougall and as an early local landmark, still visible from the arterial river road to the western suburbs.
