= North Brisbane Burial Ground =

Former cemetery in Queensland, Australia

Coordinates: 27.4645°S 153.0100°E

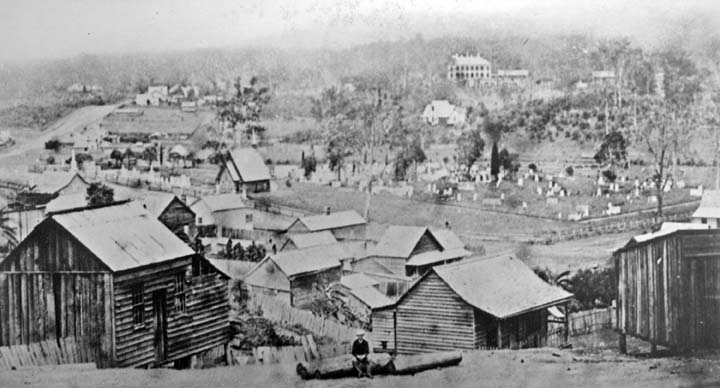
Looking across the former Paddington Cemetery, circa 1870

The North Brisbane Burial Ground (1843–1875) was a former cemetery in the Town of Brisbane, Queensland, Australia. It was in the area now known as the suburbs of Milton and Paddington. It was also known as North Brisbane Cemetery, Paddington Cemetery and Milton Cemetery.

== Geography ==
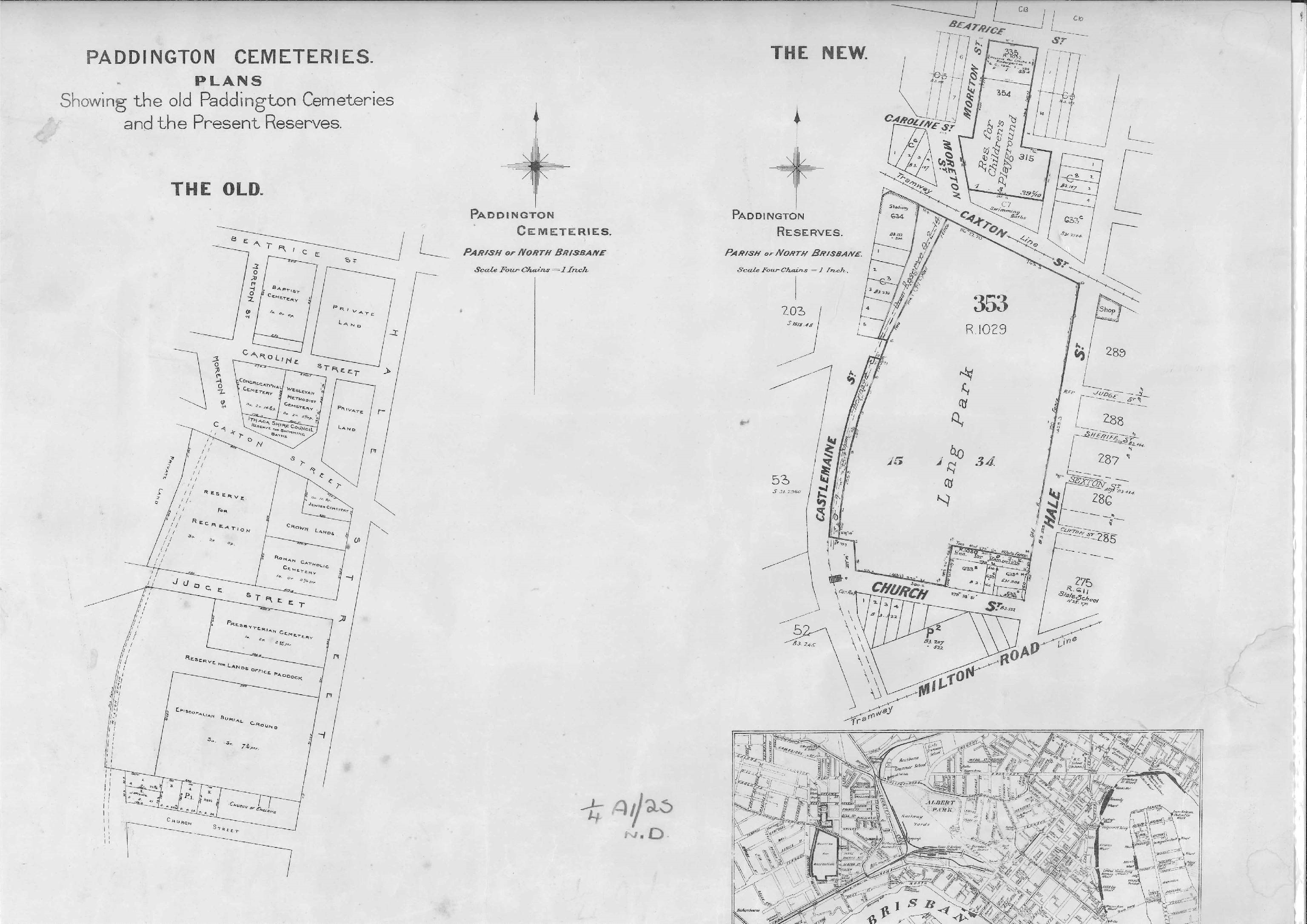
Plans showing the redevelopment of the cemetery, circa 1914

The burial ground was located across four blocks bounded by Beatrice Street on the north, Hale Street on the east, Church Street on the south and the present-day Castlemain Street on the west. This land is now used as Lang Park stadium and Ithaca Swimming Pool and children's parkland (see plans).

== History ==
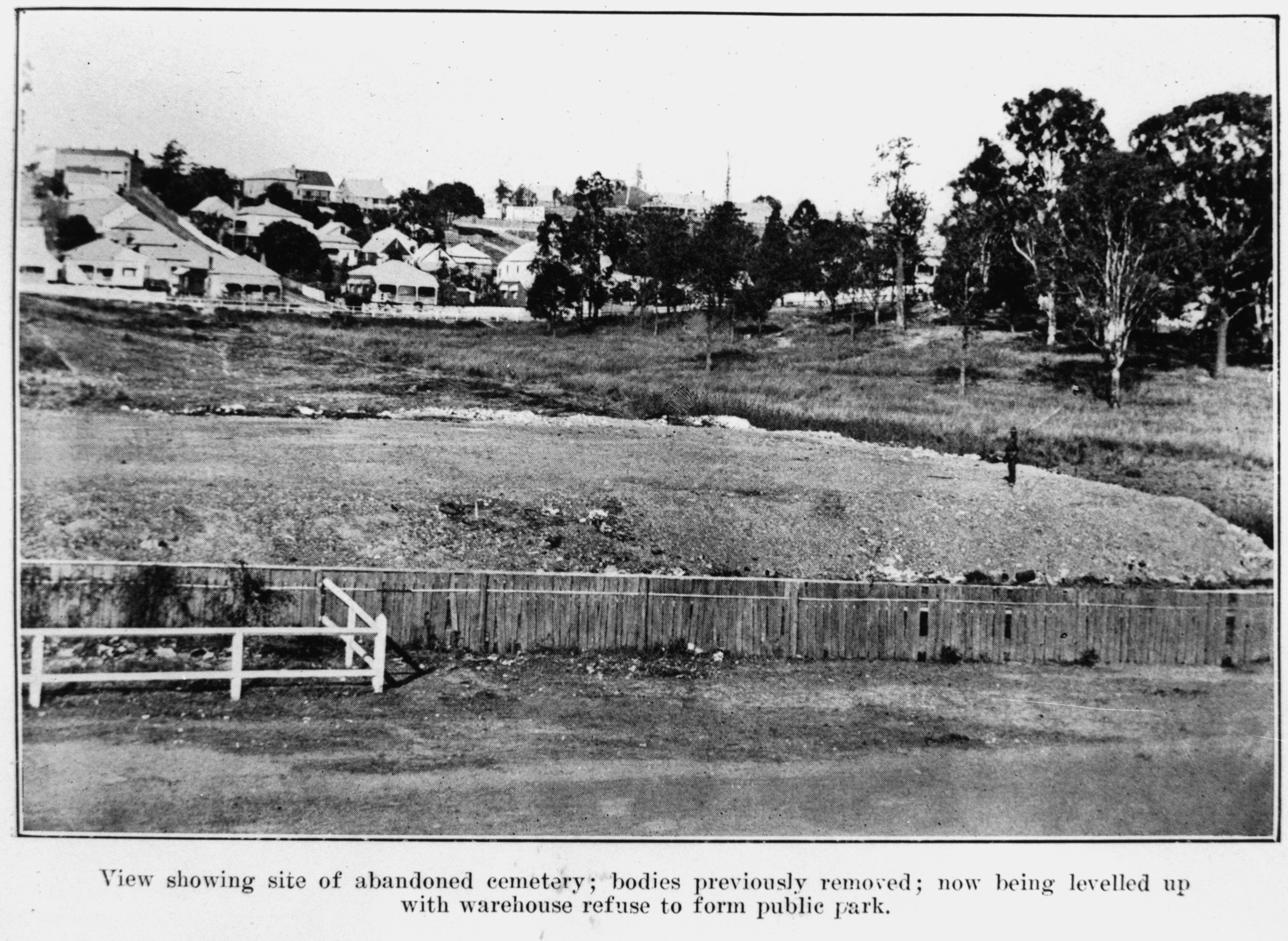
Paddington Cemetery, 1917, now underneath Lang Park

The First Brisbane Burial Ground was established in 1825 when Brisbane was established as the Moreton Bay penal colony at present-day Skew Street (near the William Jolly Bridge northern endpoint). It was in use until 1843 when the North Brisbane Burial Ground opened.

The North Brisbane burial ground was in use from 1843 to 1875, during which time up to 10,000 people may have been buried there. After 1875, the burial ground was closed and new burials were to take place in the newly established Toowong Cemetery.

Circa 1862 the Anglican Church established a mortuary chapel for the cemetery. The mortuary chapel was demolished in 1891.

The cemetery was flooded during the 1893 Brisbane flood.

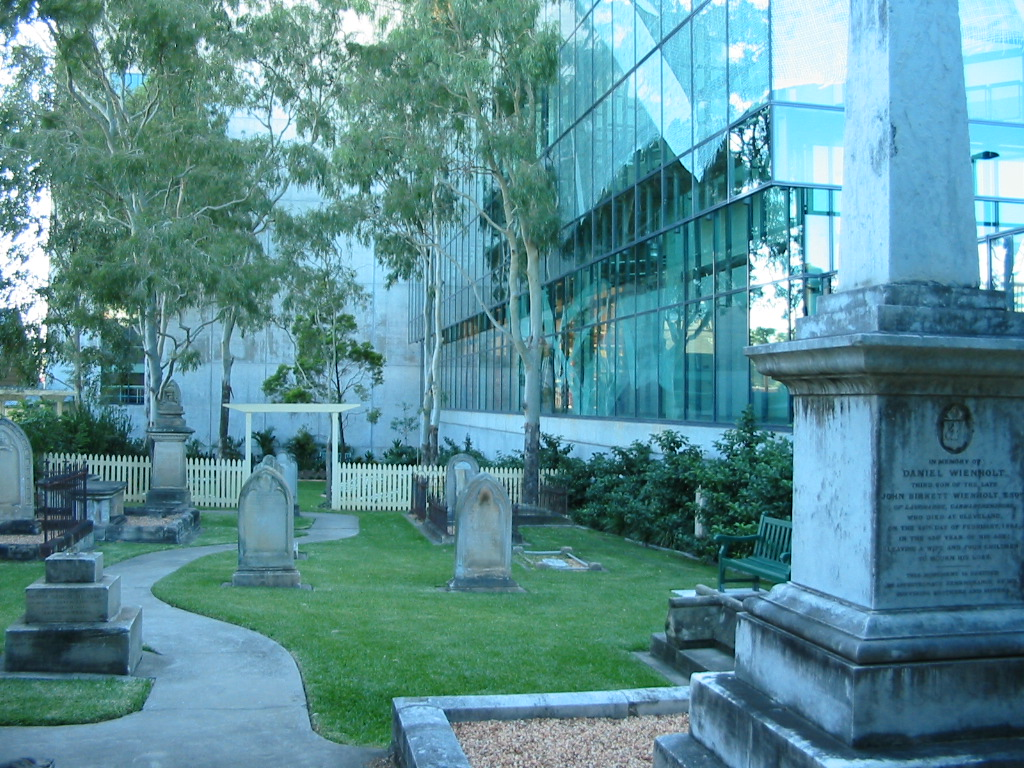
Memorial reserve, Christ Church, Milton, 2005

In 1907, the Ithaca Shire Council began to plan to convert the cemetery, by then an eyesore for the community, into a recreational reserve. However, the council did not control the land, as individual religious denominations continued to have control of their respective burial grounds. By the 1910s, relatives were offered the opportunity to exhume and reinter deceased family members or to relocate their headstone or other monumental masonry. The first removals took place in 1913. Over 500 headstones were removed into a memorial reserve, a small section of the Anglican section of the cemetery, adjacent to Christ Church. In 1914, it was developed as an athletics field called Lang Park and progressively redeveloped into Brisbane's major sporting stadium, Suncorp Stadium.

During the Depression many of the headstones in the memorial reserve were removed or destroyed. In 2001, the development of Hale Street into a major traffic route resulted in the resumption of some of the memorial reserve and the remaining headstones were reorganised into an even smaller memorial park behind Christ Church (and are only accessible via the churchyard). The further development of Suncorp Stadium visually encroaches on the memorial park, its high blue glass walls reflecting blue light into the memorial reserve.

== Operation ==
The North Brisbane burial ground was not a single cemetery, but rather a collection of cemeteries operated by different religious denominations.

== Notable persons ==
Church of England section

- James Charles Burnett (1815–1854), colonial surveyor
- Richard Jones (1786–1852), businessman and politician
