= Milton Road =

Road in Brisbane, Australia

Milton Road Queensland
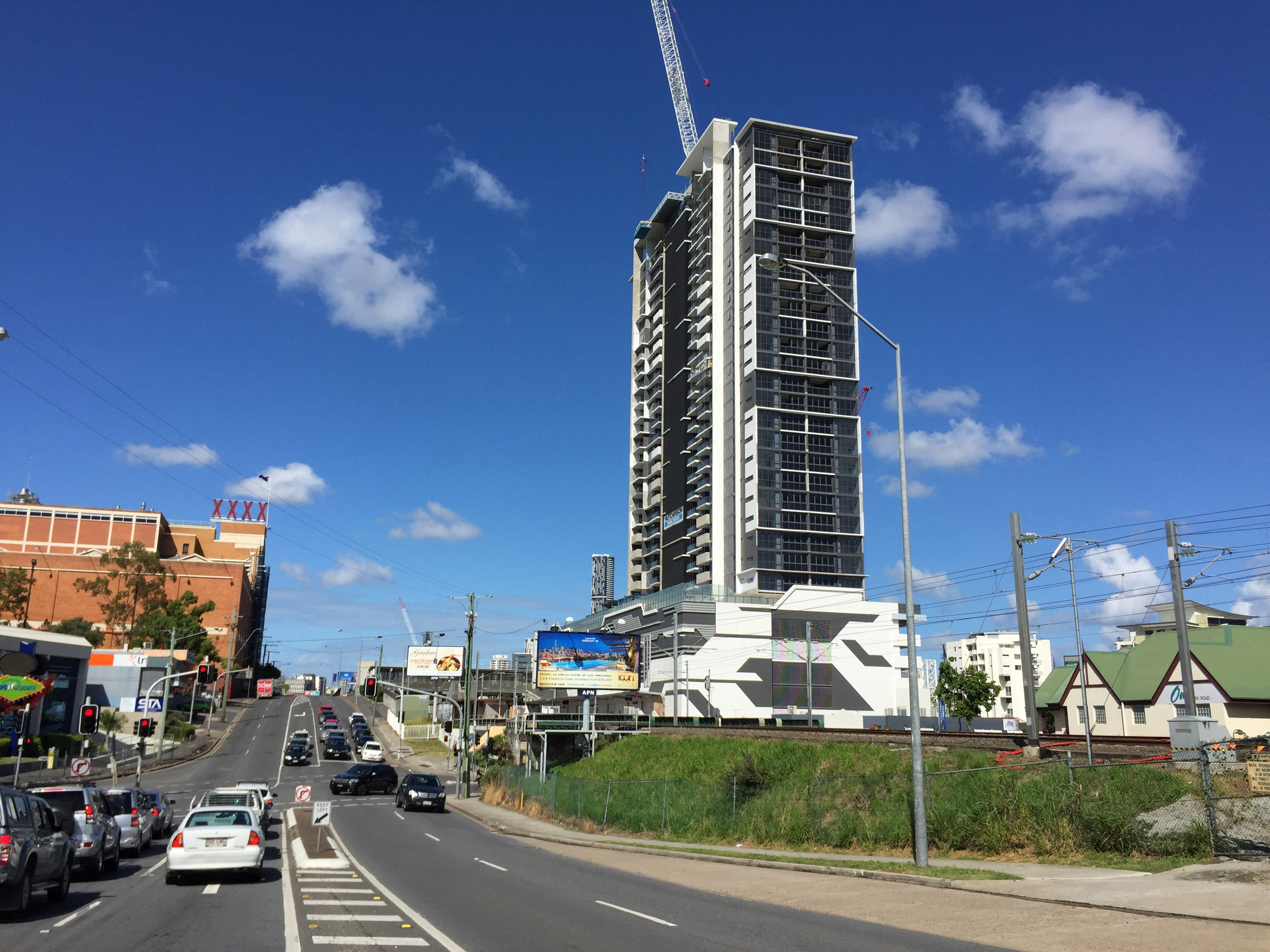
- Milton Road and the XXXX Brewery

General information
- Type: Road
- Length: 3.1 km (1.9 mi)
- Route number(s): State Route 32

Major junctions
- SW end: Western Freeway; Frederick Street in Toowong
- NE end: Petrie Terrace in Brisbane City

Location(s)
- Major suburbs: Auchenflower, Milton

Milton Road is an arterial road in Brisbane, Australia. It is currently signed as State Route 32 for its entire length. Milton Road is a major corridor for traffic between the Brisbane central business district and the western suburbs. It carried an average of 50,954 vehicles per day between July and December 2014.

Milton Road's western end is at the northern terminus of the Western Freeway at the base of Mount Coot-tha in the suburb of Toowong and progresses in a north-easterly direction through the suburbs of Auchenflower and Milton before terminating at Petrie Terrace in Brisbane City. 250 metres west of Petrie Terrace is an interchange with the Hale Street expressway which allows access to and from the Inner City Bypass. Milton Road closely parallels the Ipswich railway line.

Attractions along Milton Road include the XXXX Brewery and Lang Park stadium, both in Milton. A pedestrian bridge crosses the road here, linking the stadium to Milton railway station.

The Toowong tram line ran along the entire length of Milton Road until 1962, when the Paddington tram depot fire compelled the closure of several tram lines. Part of the line was kept open to carry spectators to and from tennis matches at Frew Park in Milton for a short while after regular services ceased.

In 2015, the Legacy Way underground road tunnel was opened. The new toll road initially reduced traffic on Milton Road by 16%.

== Major intersections ==
The entire road is in the Brisbane local government area.

Location	km	mi	Destinations	Notes
Toowong	0	0.0	Mount Coot-tha Road (State Route 32 / Metroad 5) – west – Mount Coot-tha and Western Freeway (M5) / Frederick Street (Metroad 5) – north – Bardon / Miskin Street – south – Taringa	Western end of Milton Road (State Route 32)
Toowong	0.1	0.062	Sylvan Road (State Route 20) – south–east — Coronation Drive (State Route 33)	
Toowong	0.4	0.25	Morley Street – north–west – Toowong / Croydon Street – south–east – Sylvan Road (State Route 20)	
Milton	2.2	1.4	Baroona Road – north–west – Bardon / Park Road – south–east – Coronation Drive	
Milton–Brisbane City boundary	2.1	1.3	Hale Street – north – Inner City Bypass (M3) / south – Coronation Drive and Go Between Bridge	No westbound exit to Hale Street. No eastbound exit to Hale Street southbound. No eastbound entry from Hale Street northbound.
Brisbane City	3.1	1.9	Petrie Terrace (State Route 10) – north–east – Red Hill / Upper Roma Street (State Route 10) from south–east (no right turn from Milton Road) – Brisbane City	Eastern end of Milton Road
1.000 mi = 1.609 km; 1.000 km = 0.621 mi: Incomplete access
