= Ambrose Eldridge =

Australian chemist

Ambrose Eldridge (circa 1815 – 9 May 1860) was a chemist and experimental farmer in Brisbane, Colony of Queensland.

== Early life ==
Ambrose Eldridge was born about 1815 in England, the son of John York Eldridge.

== Queensland years ==
Ambrose Eldridge was a Sydney chemist who arrived in Moreton Bay in late July 1847 to work in John Taggart's Medical Hall, a chemist shop in Queen Street. Taggart eventually sold out to Eldridge, who took over from 1 October 1849, and developed the business as a chemist, druggist, oilman, and grocer.

In the late 1840s and 1850s, Eldridge adopted an active and enthusiastic role in the development of Brisbane and Queensland. He was prominent in the Separation movement and served on a wide variety of local committees (for most of which he was a founding member), including those of the Hospital, the proposed Brisbane Market (1851), the Moreton Bay Steam Navigation Company, the Moreton Bay Horticultural Society, the Brisbane Exchange, the Northern Districts Agricultural and Pastoral Association, the Moreton Bay Immigration and Land Company (first chairman of directors in 1855–56), and the Moreton Bay Building Society, which was dissolved in 1854 to re-emerge as the Moreton Bay Permanent Investment and Building Society in 1855. He was active in promoting local issues such as a bridge over Breakfast Creek, a committee to communicate between the electors of Moreton Bay and their representative in the Legislative Council in Sydney, a survey of the Brisbane River entrance and bar, direct emigration to Moreton Bay, government funding to churches, and regularly subscribed to rewards for the discovery of gold in the Moreton and Darling Downs districts. He was a prominent member of St John's Anglican Church, and an active participant in the Brisbane School of Arts and Sciences and the Moreton Bay Musical Society. During the early 1850s his business flourished and he acquired a number of Brisbane town and suburban allotments.

Eldridge was a well-respected townsman with a clear commitment to the development of Brisbane at political, civic, economic and social levels, but he was also something of a visionary. Like the indomitable Dr John Dunmore Lang, who envisioned a Moreton Bay populated by yeomen farmers, Eldridge was determined to prove that agriculture in the Northern Districts of New South Wales was economically viable.

In the second half of 1851, Eldridge, who had little knowledge of farming, purchased Western Suburban Allotments 4 to 11, totalling over 30 acres, along the northern bank of the Brisbane River, just beyond the town boundary. Here, at what he named Milton Farm, Eldridge experimented with cotton growing, hoping to prove that agriculture at Moreton Bay could be sustained and profitable. Whilst not the only Moreton Bay resident to experiment with cotton-growing at the time, he was initially one of the most successful.

Cotton was a logical crop with which to experiment – it was one of the principal import of Great Britain, and an important basis of her manufacturing industry, and if grown successfully at Moreton Bay, would ensure the prosperity of the Northern Districts of New South Wales, and enhance local aspirations for Separation. By September 1852, five acres of the Milton land had been cleared, and were planted the following month with seeds of the finest Sea Island Cotton. At the close of 1852, Eldridge retired from business, selling the Medical Hall and devoting his time to the Milton experiment.

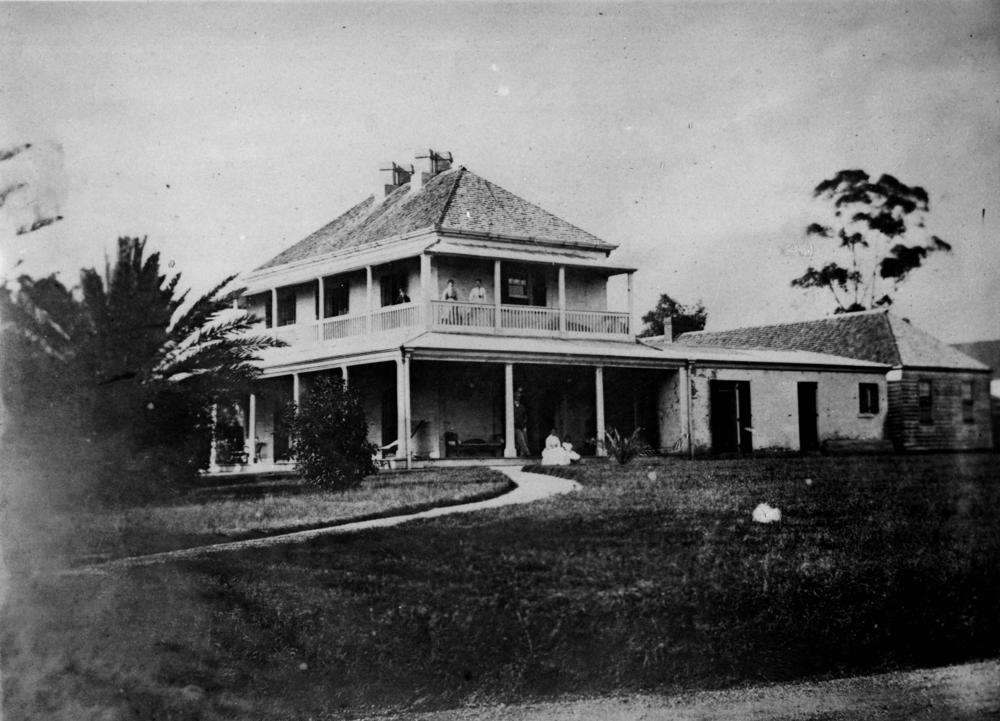
Side view of Milton House with the Manning family on the verandah, 1868

Eldridge erected Milton House in 1852 or 1853. It was the first substantial house in the area and soon a local landmark, being prominent in early views of Brisbane. It was the base for Eldridge's experimental farming when the Moreton Bay region was struggling to establish itself, and later for John Frederick McDougall's considerable pastoral holdings in the area.

By June 1853 the first crop of Milton cotton was being picked, yielding at least 20 bales. Eldridge reported in the local press that, not including the cost of land and land clearing, he had expended £38 in the experiment, and had made a profit of £14. That December he was awarded first prize of £30 by the New South Wales Government, for samples of the cotton sent to Sydney in a government-sponsored competition. Two years later he sent samples of the Milton cotton to the Paris Exhibition of 1855, where it was highly acclaimed.

In 1853, Eldridge expanded his efforts to promote profitable local farming, taking up on long lease approximately 400 acres at Eagle Farm. By late 1854 this land had been cleared, and in March 1855, Eldridge announced his intention of removing to Eagle Farm, and selling the Milton Estate. The Eldridges resided at Milton through the remainder of 1855, but the property, including a mansion house was sold and transferred to pastoralist John Frederick McDougall in January 1856, for £2,300.

For Eldridge, the move spelt disaster. On 28 September 1856, his wife Mary died after giving birth to a son at Eagle Farm. The farming experiments at Eagle Farm appear to have failed, and by 1859 he had returned to the chemist business, opening a shop at Ipswich.

== Later life ==
Ambrose Elridge died on 9 May 1860 from consumption at his home in Brisbane Street, Ipswich; he was 45 years old. He left his second wife Mary and his children destitute.
