= Ziggy =

Masculine given name

Ziggy is a masculine given name, often a diminutive form (hypocorism) of Zigmunt and other names. It is also a nickname. Notable people with the name include:

== Nickname or hypocorism ==
- Ziggy Gordon (born 1993), Scottish footballer
- Ziggy Hood (born 1987), National Football League player
- Ziggy Lichman (born 1981), a contestant on the reality TV show Big Brother UK, Season 8
- Ziggy Lorenc (born 1958), Canadian television and radio personality
- Ziggy Marley (born 1968), Grammy-winning Jamaican musician; oldest son of Bob Marley
- Ziggy Modeliste (born 1948), American drummer best known as a founding member of the funk group The Meters
- Ziggy Niszczot (born 1955), Australian former professional rugby league footballer
- Ziggy Switkowski (born 1948), Australian businessman and nuclear physicist
- Ziggy the Bag Man (born c. 1950), Zbygnew Marian Willzek, a homeless man who lives in Toowong, Brisbane, Australia

== Stage name ==
- Ziggy Alberts (born 1994), an Australian folk singer and songwriter
- Ziggy Elman, stage name of American jazz trumpeter Harry Aaron Finkelman (1914–1968)
- Ziggy Stardust, a 1970s persona of David Bowie (1947–2016), English musician, singer-songwriter, producer, actor and arranger
- Ziggy Ramo (born Ziggy Ramo Burrmuruk Fatnowna), an Indigenous Australian singer, songwriter and activist

== Fictional characters ==
- Ziggy, a character in the video game Laura Bow 2
- The title character of Ziggy (comic strip)
- Ziggy Astoni, character from the Australian soap opera Home and Away
- Ziggy (EastEnders), from the British soap opera EastEnders
- Ziggy Sobotka, a major character in the second season of The Wire
- Ziggy, from the Icelandic children's television program LazyTown
- Ziggy (Quantum Leap), from the American TV series Quantum Leap
- Ziggy (Xenosaga), from the science fiction video game series Xenosaga
- Demon King Ziggy from the Japanese manga Edens Zero
- Ziggy Stardust (character), fictional alter ego of David Bowie
- Ziggy Chapman from the HBO series Big Little Lies
- Ziggy Pascal, character in British soap opera Family Affairs
- Ziggy Roscoe, character in British soap opera Hollyoaks
- Eric Ziggy Greaves A Character from the British children's television drama series Grange Hill
- Ziggy, a character in the video game Fortnite
- Ziggy, a character in the video game Brawl Stars

== As a female nickname ==
- Christine "Ziggy" Berman from Fear Street Part Two: 1978
- Ziggy Karst, a Marvel Comics character and member of the Jean Grey School for Higher Learning

== Animals ==
- Ziggy (elephant) (1917–1975), an Indian elephant who lived at the Brookfield Zoo outside Chicago

== See also ==
- Zigi, Ghanaian singer
- Ziggi Recado, reggae singer
- Siggy (disambiguation)
- Zig (disambiguation)
- Zygi, village in Cyprus
- Zygi (given name)
