= Temple of Peace =

Temple of Peace may refer to:

- Temple of Peace, Cardiff, a non-religious civic building in the civic centre of Cardiff, Wales
- Temple of Peace, Rome, also known as Forum of Vespasian, one of the imperial forums
- Temple of Peace (Toowong Cemetery), Brisbane, Queensland, Australia, a pacifist war memorial
- Temple for Peace, a construction project of the Buddhist congregation Vajradhara-Ling in Normandy.
