= Toowong =

- Suburb
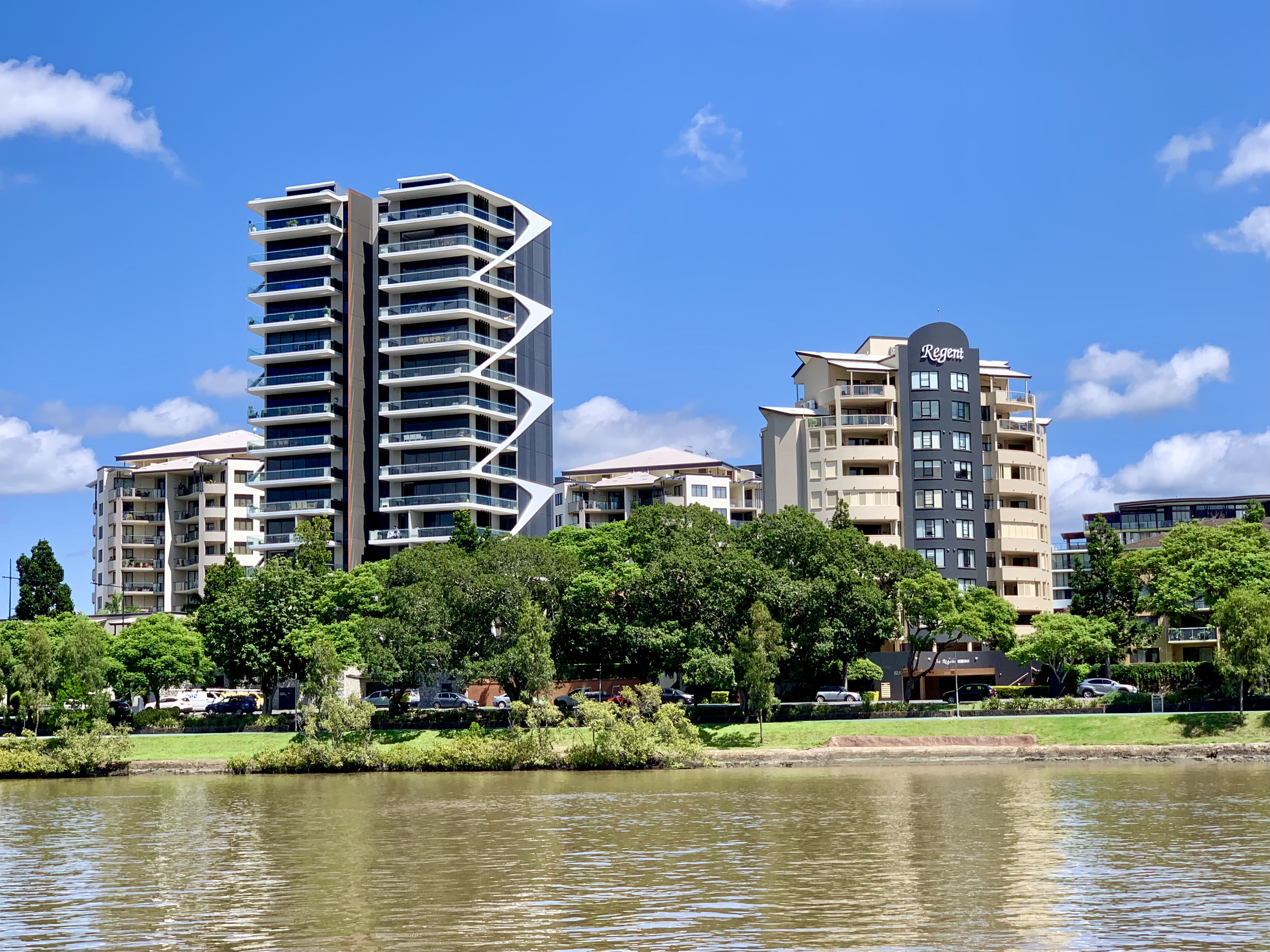
- Toowong apartment buildings viewed from the Brisbane River, 2020

- Interactive map of Toowong
- Coordinates: 27.4816°S 152.99°E
- Country: Australia
- State: Queensland
- City: Brisbane
- LGA: Brisbane City (Paddington Ward and Walter Taylor Ward)
- Location: 5.9 km (3.7 mi) SW of Brisbane CBD

Government
  - State electorate: Maiwar
  - Federal division: Ryan

Area
  - Total: 4.1 km^{2} (1.6 sq mi)

Population
  - Total: 12,556 (2021 census)
  - Density: 3,060/km^{2} (7,930/sq mi)
- Time zone: UTC+10:00 (AEST)
- Postcode: 4066
Suburbs around Toowong
Mount Coot-tha	Bardon	Auchenflower
Mount Coot-tha	Toowong	West End
Taringa	Taringa	St Lucia

Toowong (/təˈwɒŋ/ tə-WONG) is a riverside suburb in the City of Brisbane, Queensland, Australia. In the 2021 census, Toowong had a population of 12,556 people.

== Geography ==
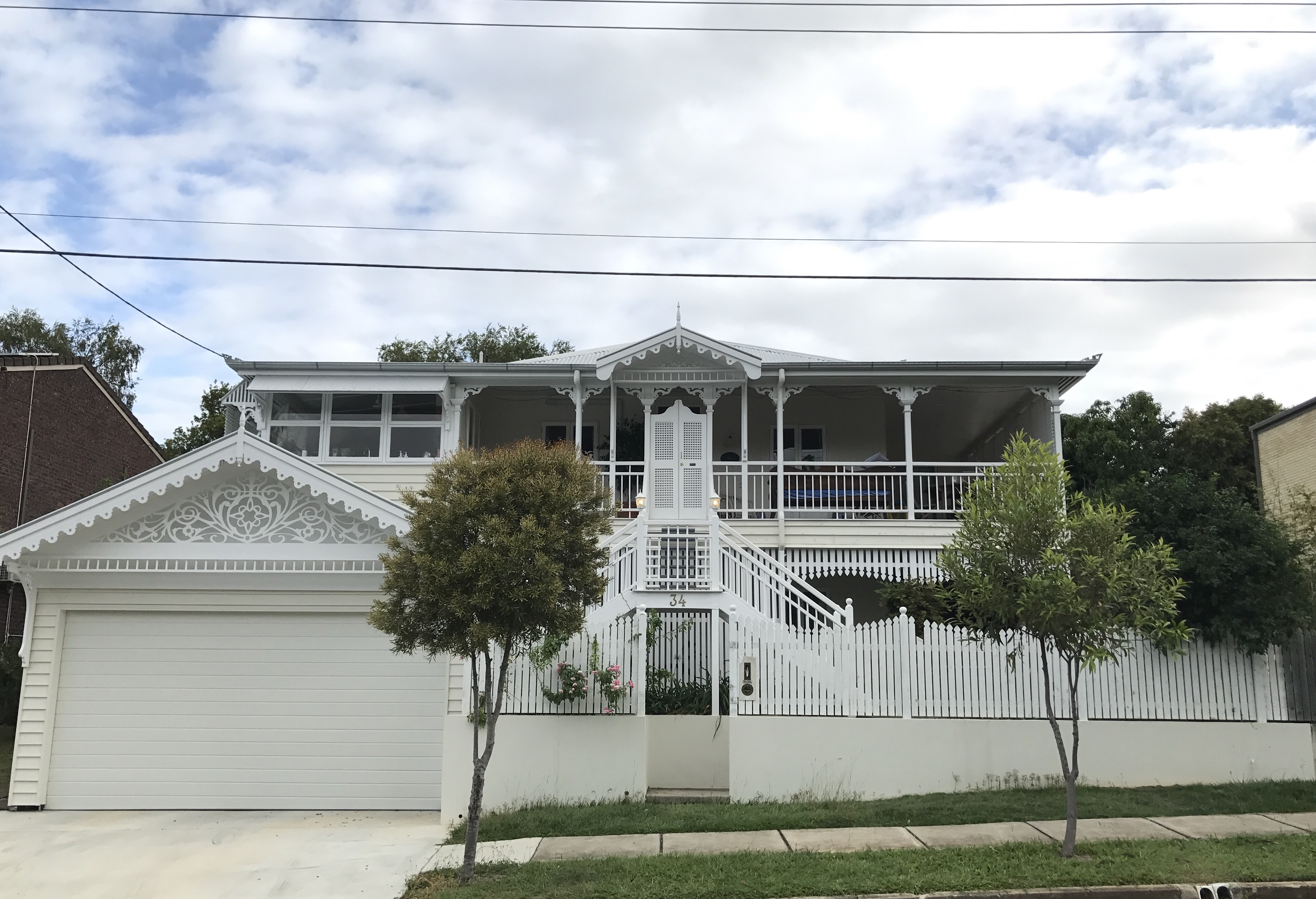
Queenslander style detached house in Toowong

Toowong is situated between Mount Coot-tha and the Brisbane River and is made up of rolling hills with little flat land. Since European settlement most of the land has been cleared for residential and commercial use with the exception of some park land and bushland near the Western Freeway.

At the centre of Toowong is a commercial precinct including Toowong Village, and several other commercial and office buildings. The western side of the suburb is predominantly residential with a mix of medium density dwellings and detached Queenslander houses, extending to the foothills of Mount Coot-tha.

Toowong borders the Brisbane River. Along the riverside are a number of transport links: Coronation Drive, the Regatta ferry wharf, and the Bicentennial Bike Path (a bike and walkway) to the Brisbane CBD. This section of the river is the Toowong Reach.

== History ==
Several early settlers subdivided their blocks, including Richard Drew who named his subdivision the 'Village of Toowong' in 1862. The origin of the name Toowong was derived from an Aboriginal word describing a bird.

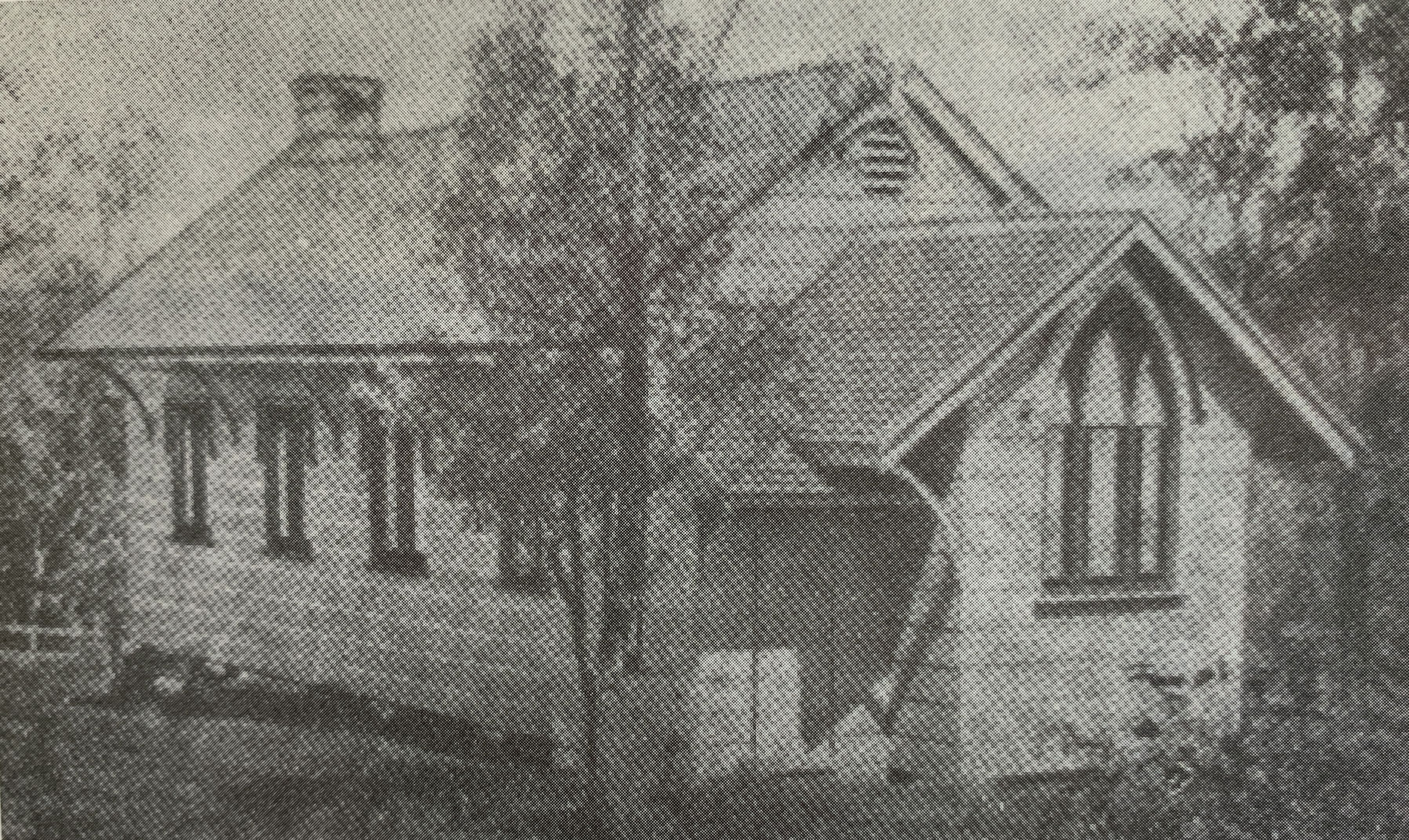
First St Thomas Anglican Church, 1865–1877

On Sunday 29 October 1865, the Anglican Church of St Thomas the Apostle opened on Lot 13 in Curlew Street, donated by Richard Langler Drew (27.48986°S 152.98869°E).

Toowong Mixed School opened on 10 October 1870. In 1879, it was renamed Indooroopilly State School. In 1888, it was renamed Indooroopilly Pocket State School. In 1905, it was renamed Ironside State School. It is within the present-day boundaries of the neighbouring suburb of St Lucia.

Toowong started developing with the arrival of the Ipswich railway line in 1875. It was originally suburb of detached villas and large yards owned by an elite upper-middle class that worked in the city and socialised with each other.

A Primitive Methodist Church was opened in Toowong on Sunday 9 April 1876.

The Shire of Toowong was created in 1880, in response to a petition from Toowong residents. In 1881 the population numbered 1,275 and seven years later it had almost doubled to 2,230. By 1901 the population numbered around 4,700.

Toowong State School opened on 22 January 1880 in Aston Street with enrolments reaching 350 students in the first nine years. In September 1910, the school was relocated to its present site. In 1927, it achieved its highest enrolment of 895 students, so many that the verandahs were used as classrooms.

In 1881, a Baptist church opened in Toowong; it is still extant and listed on the Brisbane Heritage Register.

In 1899, 461 allotments were advertised to be auctioned by Isles, Love & Co on Saturday, 2 September 1899 (Federation Day), Saturday 9 September 1899 and Saturday 16 September 1899. This area was called the Dunmore Estate and is now mostly in Toowong as well as partly in Milton. On the real estate map for Dunmore Estate, Cribb's Paddock, Milton is a black and white photo titled "Panoramic view of the river looking towards town". In 1899 it was advertised in the Brisbane Courier for contractors for the Dunmore Estate, Cribb's Paddock, Milton to make an access road through the lagoon and a roadway under the railway bridge. It was reported in The Brisbane Courier and The Telegraph that a total of 240 lots were sold - 108 lots on 2 September 1899, 81 lots on 9 September 1899 and 51 lots on 16 September 1899.

On 1 February 1902, Clayfield Boys' College was established on Old Sandgate Road (now Bage Street) near the Wesleyan Church at Eagle Junction by Arthur (Barney) Rudd with an initial enrolment of 4 students. In 1909, it began to accept boarding students. In 1912, the school moved to a new location on the corner of Bayview Terrace, Clayfield, near the tram terminus. In July 1918, the school was purchased by the Presbyterian and Methodist Schools Association and renamed Brisbane Boys' College. In 1931, the school relocated to its current campus in Toowong with 193 students.

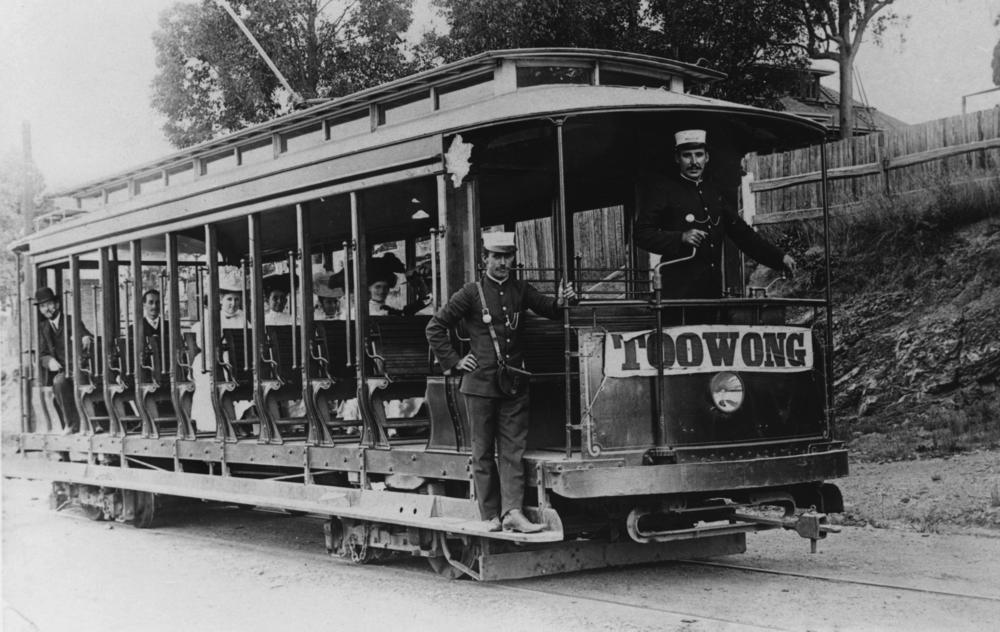
Tram at the Toowong tram terminus c. 1910

In 1903, the Brisbane Tramways Company built a tram line along Milton Road to service the western side of the suburb. Initially the tram line terminated at the cemetery, but was later extended up Woodstock Road (Formally Dean Street), to the palatial home of the then Manager of the tram company Joseph Stillman Badger. In 1922, along with the rest of Brisbane's tram system, the line was taken over by the government (see Transport for Brisbane.) The tram line closed in December 1962, after the disastrous Paddington tram depot fire.

On 2 November 1902, Archbishop Robert Dunne laid the foundation school for a Catholic primary school in Holland Street. St Michael's and Holy Souls School opened on 1 July 1903. In 1916, it was renamed St Ignatius School. The school outgrew its original site and, in 1930, re-located to its current site as a combined church and school on land donated by the Sisters of Mercy. At that time there were 212 students in 9 classes. In 1948, a new 2-storey brick building was opened.

The Toowong Baths were first constructed as a 25 metres (82 ft) swimming pool in 1909 on Coronation Drive south of Booth Street (27.4838°S 152.9945°E). Originally established by a private company, the baths were acquired in 1920 by the Toowong Town Council. In 1925, the Town of Toowong was amalgamated into the City of Brisbane and the baths come under the control of the Brisbane City Council. In the late 1950s, the buildings associated with the pool were replaced with new iconic buildings designed by Brisbane City Council architect James Birrell. The new Birrell-designed Toowong Library was constructed on Coronation Drive on the northern side of Booth Street. Despite public outcry, the Brisbane City Council sold the pool complex to fund the redevelopment of Toowong Library (which was also controversial) blaming declining patronage of the pool. The Toowong Swimming Pool was demolished on 21 March 2001. An office block now occupies the site.

Stuartholme School was established in March 1920 by the Society of the Sacred Heart as a boarding school for girls with 5 initial enrolments. It now also accepts day students.

On Saturday 25 October 1930, a stump-capping ceremony was held for a public hall in Grosvenor Street in West Toowong.

On 21 November 1959, the Anglican Church of the Holy Spirit in West Toowong was dedicated by Archbishop Reginald Halse. It was on Exmouth/Orchard Street (27.4846°S 152.9779°E). Its closure on 28 November 2006 was approved by Assistant Bishop Ron Williams.

Toowong State High School opened on 29 January 1963. It was on the site of the house Easton Gray, once owned by Sir Arthur Hunter Palmer, Premier of Queensland and subsequently the residence of his brother-in-law Hugh Mosman (who discovered gold at Charters Towers). The site was purchased by the Queensland Government in 1944 for the construction of a secondary school in Toowong. On 9 May 2000, the school was renamed Toowong College. It closed on 31 December 2006. It was at 78 Bywong Street (27.4871°S 152.9789°E). The school's website was archived.

The Queensland Academy for Science Mathematics and Technology opened in 2007 on the Toowong College site.

=== Local government ===
Toowong has been part of a number of different local governments:

- Toowong Division (1879–1880)
- Shire of Toowong (1880–1903)
- Town of Toowong (1903–1925)
- City of Brisbane (1925–present day)

== Demographics ==
In the 2011 census, Toowong had a population of 11,255 people; 50.2% female and 49.8% male. The median age of the Toowong population was 28 years, 9 years below the Australian median. The most notable difference was the group of people aged in their twenties; in Toowong this group made up 36.1% of the population, compared to 13.8% nationally. This is largely because of the close proximity of the University of Queensland. Children aged under 15 years made up 10.8% of the population and people aged 65 years and over made up 8.3% of the population. 61.1% of people living in Toowong were born in Australia, compared to the national average of 69.8%. The other top responses for country of birth were England 3.9%, China 3.8%, New Zealand 3%, India 1.8%, Malaysia 1.6%. 72.7% of people spoke only English at home; the next most popular languages were 5.3% Mandarin, 2.2% Cantonese, 1.3% Spanish, 0.7% Korean, 0.7% French. The most common responses for religion in Toowong were No Religion 33.7%, Catholic 22.0%, Anglican 12.0%, Uniting Church 5.0% and Buddhism 2.9%.

In the 2016 census, Toowong had a population of 10,830 people.

In the 2021 census, Toowong had a population of 12,556 people.

== Heritage listings ==
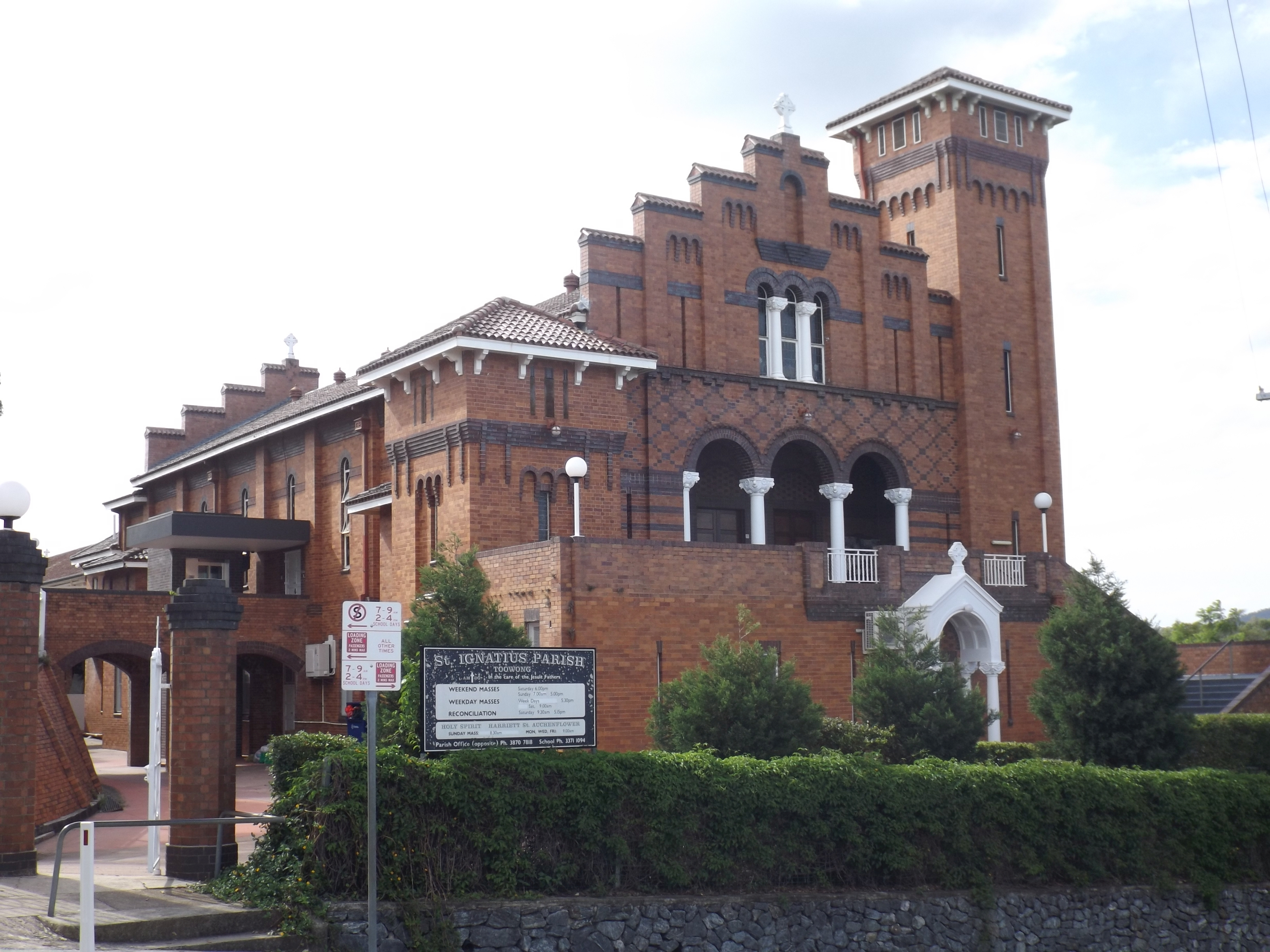
Church of Saint Ignatius Loyola

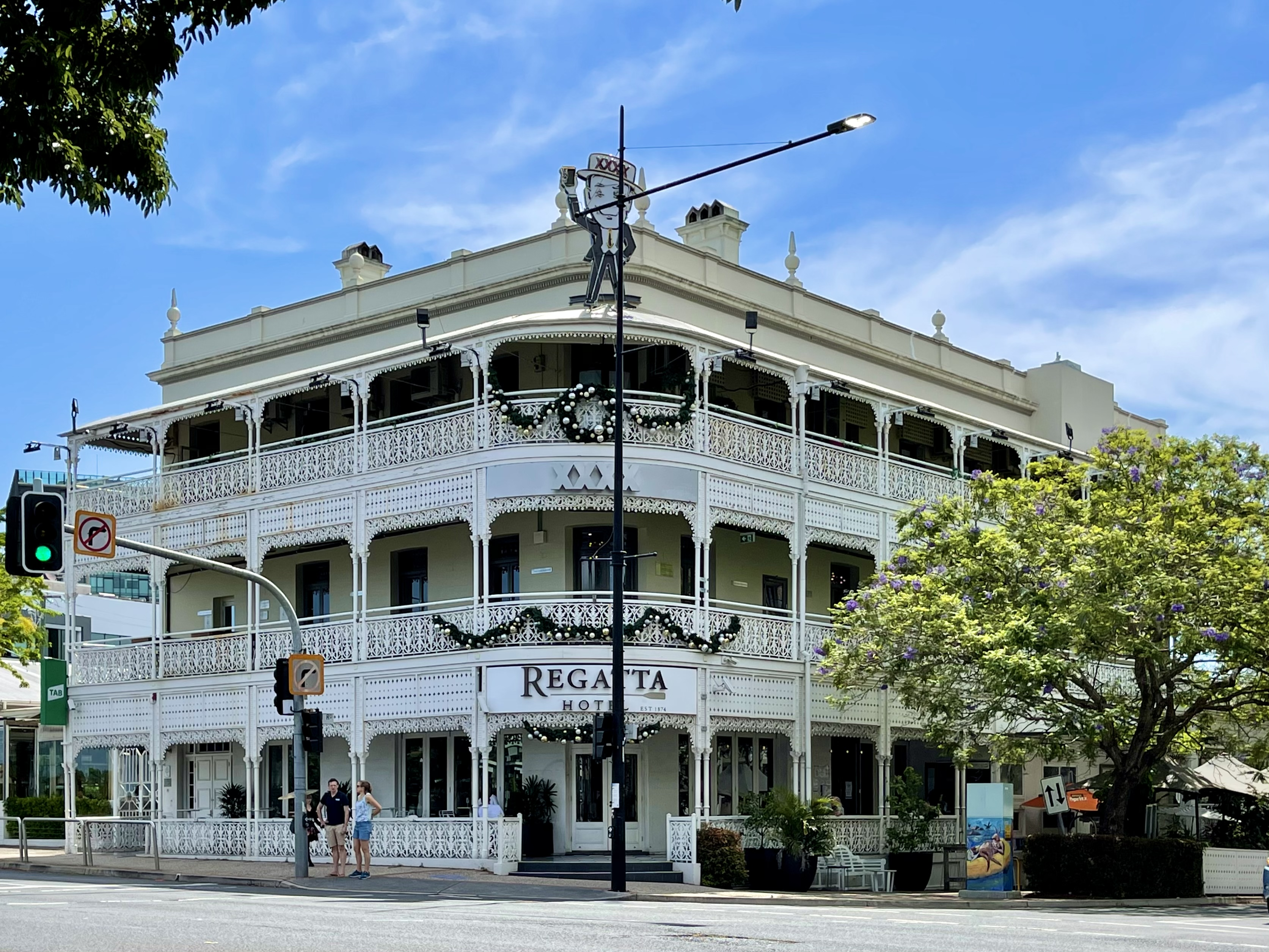
Regatta Hotel, Toowong

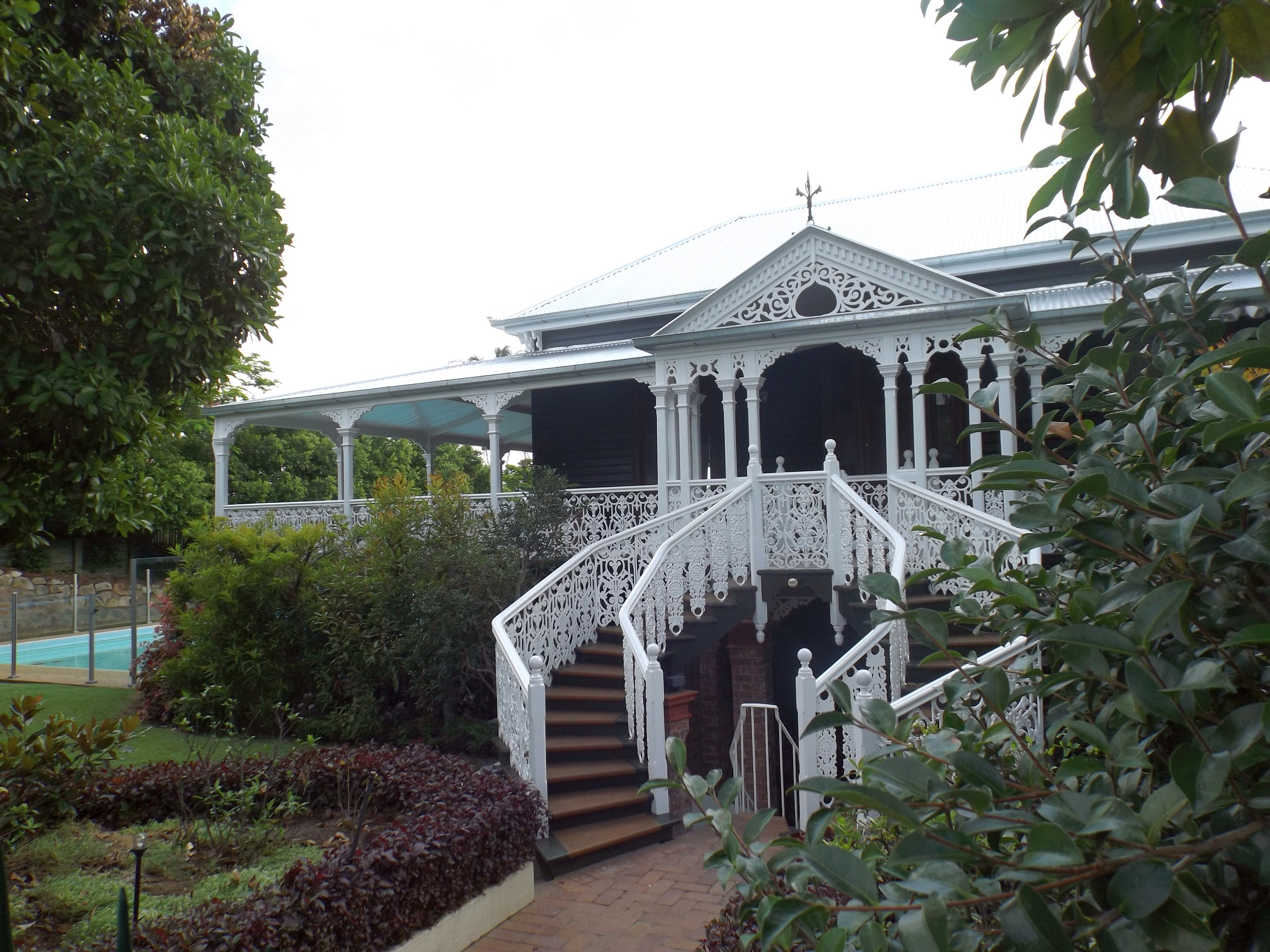
Warrawee, Brisbane

Toowong has a number of heritage-listed sites, including:

- St Briavels (house), 20 Archer Street
- Bowersholme (house), 4 Aston Street
- Stuartholme School, 365 Birdwood Terrace
- Rhos-y-Medre (house), 29 Burns Road
- Sylvania (house), 1 Clouston Lane
- Regatta Hotel, 543 Coronation Drive
- Toowong Municipal Library (former), 579–583 Coronation Drive
- Middenbury House, 600 Coronation Drive
- Craigsmount (house), 33 Curlew Street
- Warrawee (house), 10 Dean Street
- Anzac Park, 100 Dean Street
- Toby the Dog Toowong Post Office memorial, 58 Ebor Street
- Kayes Rocks, Glenny Street (27.4889°S 152.9944°E)
- Church of Saint Ignatius Loyola, 46 Grove Street
- Mount St Mary's Convent (also known as Goldicott), 50 Grove Street
- Post-war house, 7 Herbert Street
- Spanish Mission house, 23 Herbert Street
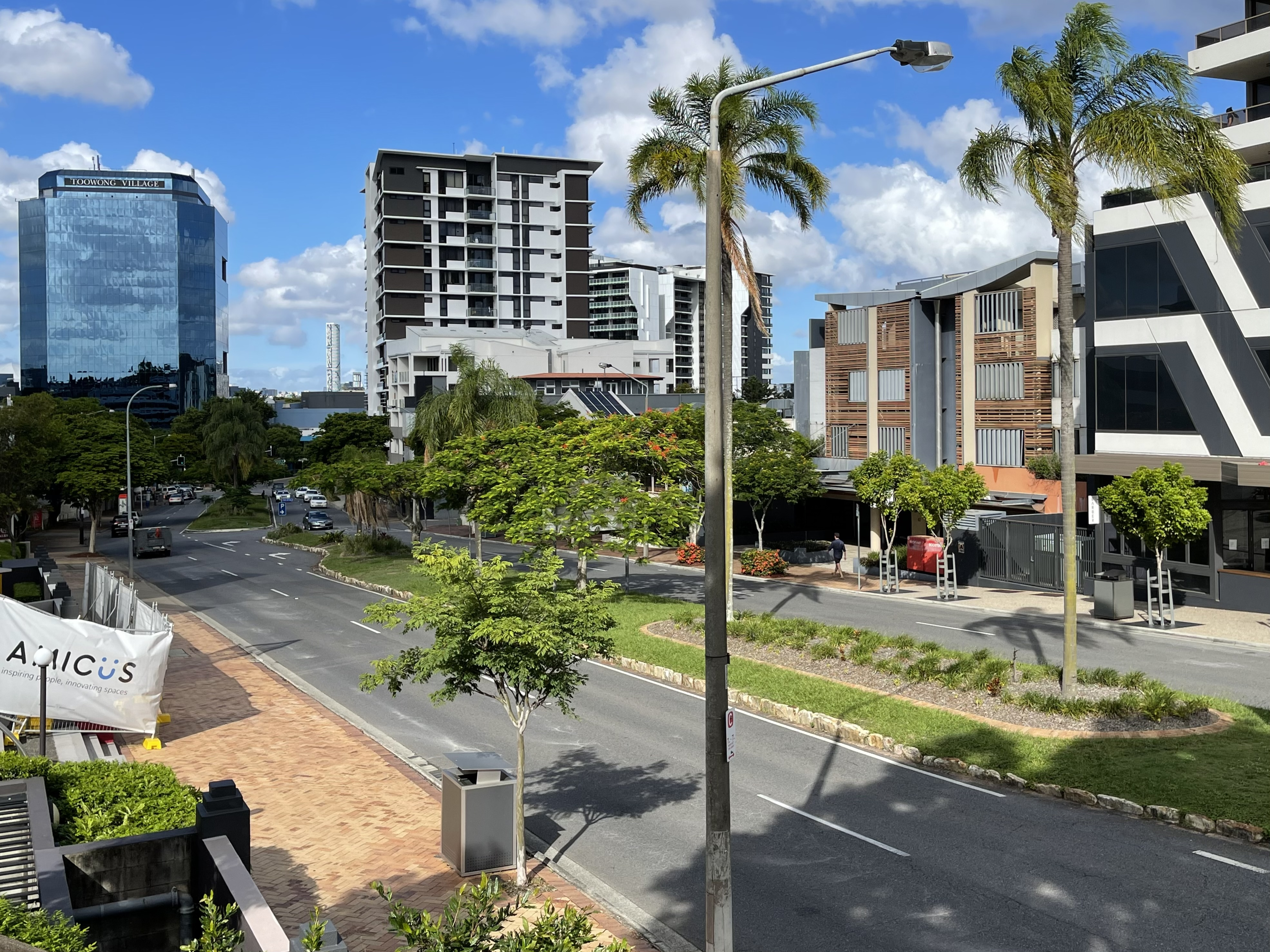
- Patterson's Folly (planted median strip), 2021
  Patterson's Folly, High Street (27.4870°S 152.9911°E)
- Royal Exchange Hotel and Royal Exchange Building, 22 High Street
- former Carver and Co. building (now Peerless Dry Cleaning), 53 High Street
- St Thomas Church of England, 69 High Street
- Kiarrba (house), 4 Holmes Street
- Toowong Baptist Church, 5 Jephson Street
- Toowong Fire Station, 20A Jephson Street
- St Arvans (house), 3 Moggill Road
- Brisbane Boys' College Buildings, 55 Moggill Road
- Richard Randall Art Studio, Mount Coot-tha Road
- Toowong Cemetery, corner of Mount Coot-tha road and Frederick Street, including within the cemetery
  - Caskey Monument
  - Temple of Peace
  - Trooper Cobb's Grave
- Toowong State School, 50 Quinn Street (37 St Osyth Street)
- Kinellar (house), 89 Sherwood Road
- Dovercourt (house), 124 Sherwood Road
- Toowong Memorial Park (also known as Toowong Cenotaph, Toowong Soldiers' Memorial), 65 Sylvan Road
- Memorial Crows Ash, 143A Sylvan Road
- Tram stop, Woodstock Road (27.4836°S 152.9838°E)
- Endrim, Woodstock Road tram shed, and tram track (also known as Arlington, 'Boss' Badger's residence), 6–28 Woodstock Road (27.4840°S 152.9845°E)

== Education ==
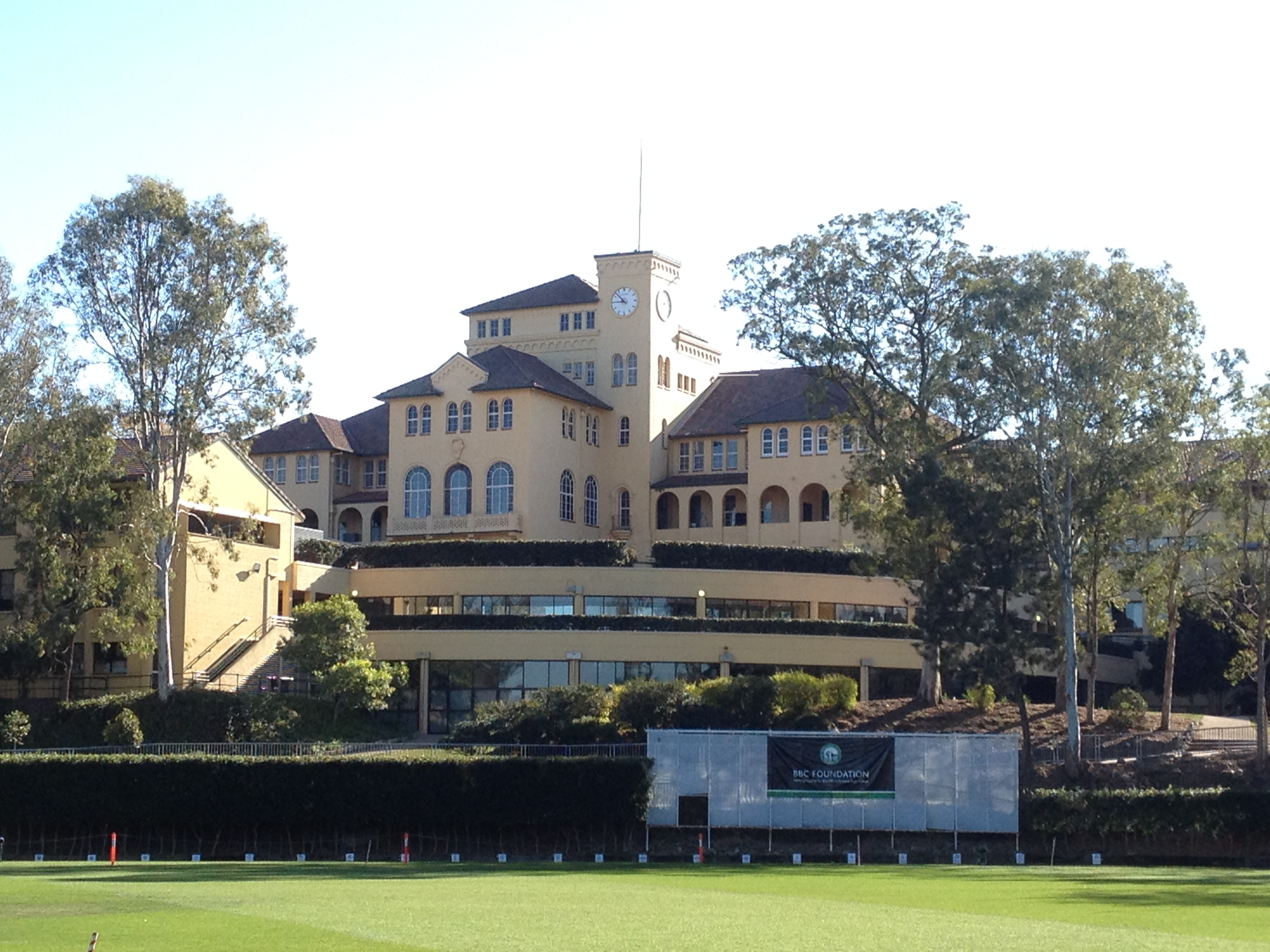
Main Building Brisbane Boys' College, viewed from Moggill Road

Toowong State School is a government primary (Prep–6) school for boys and girls at 37 St Osyth Street (27.4818°S 152.9892°E). In 2018, the school had an enrolment of 293 students with 29 teachers (21 full-time equivalent) and 33 non-teaching staff (16 full-time equivalent). It includes a special education program.

St Ignatius School is a Catholic primary (Prep–6) school for boys and girls at 46 Grove Street (27.4857°S 152.9863°E). In 2018, the school had an enrolment of 260 students with 23 teachers (16 full-time equivalent) and 11 non-teaching staff (7 full-time equivalent).

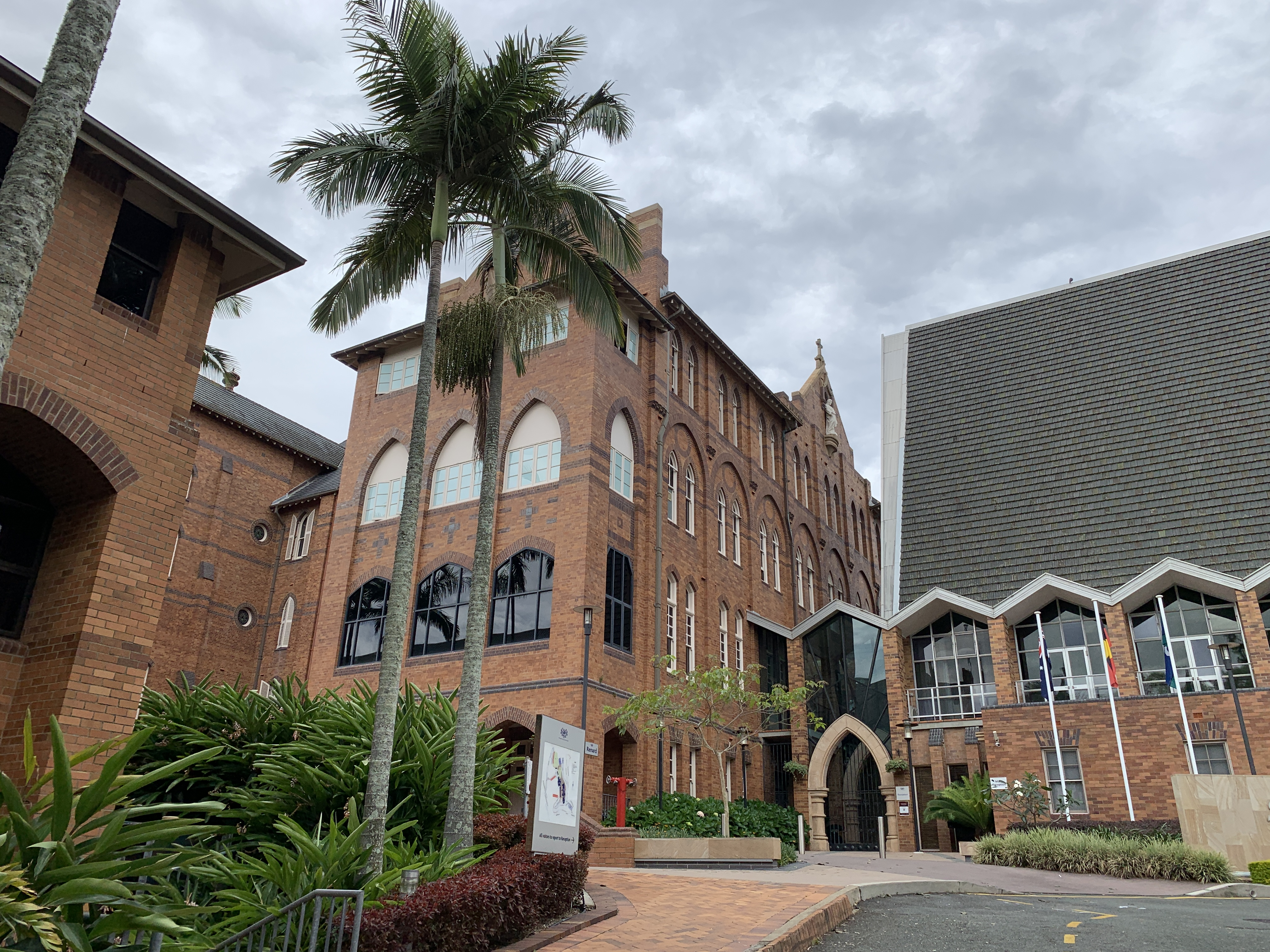
Stuartholme School, Toowong.

Brisbane Boys' College is a private Presbyterian and Uniting Church primary and secondary (Prep–12) school for boys at Kensington Terrace (27.4870°S 152.9877°E). In 2018, the school had an enrolment of 1503 students with 148 teachers (136 full-time equivalent) and 100 non-teaching staff (85 full-time equivalent). It has boarding facilities.

Stuartholme School is a Catholic secondary (7–12) school for girls at 365 Birdwood Terrace (27.4701°S 152.9744°E). In 2018, the school had an enrolment of 678 students with 65 teachers (61 full-time equivalent) and 49 non-teaching staff (36 full-time equivalent). It has boarding facilities.

Queensland Academy for Science Mathematics and Technology is a government secondary (7–12) school for boys and girls at 78 Bywong Street (27.4861°S 152.9790°E). It is an academically selective school with a partnership with the University of Queensland. In 2018, the school had an enrolment of 642 students with 62 teachers (61 full-time equivalent) and 29 non-teaching staff (26 full-time equivalent).

== Facilities ==
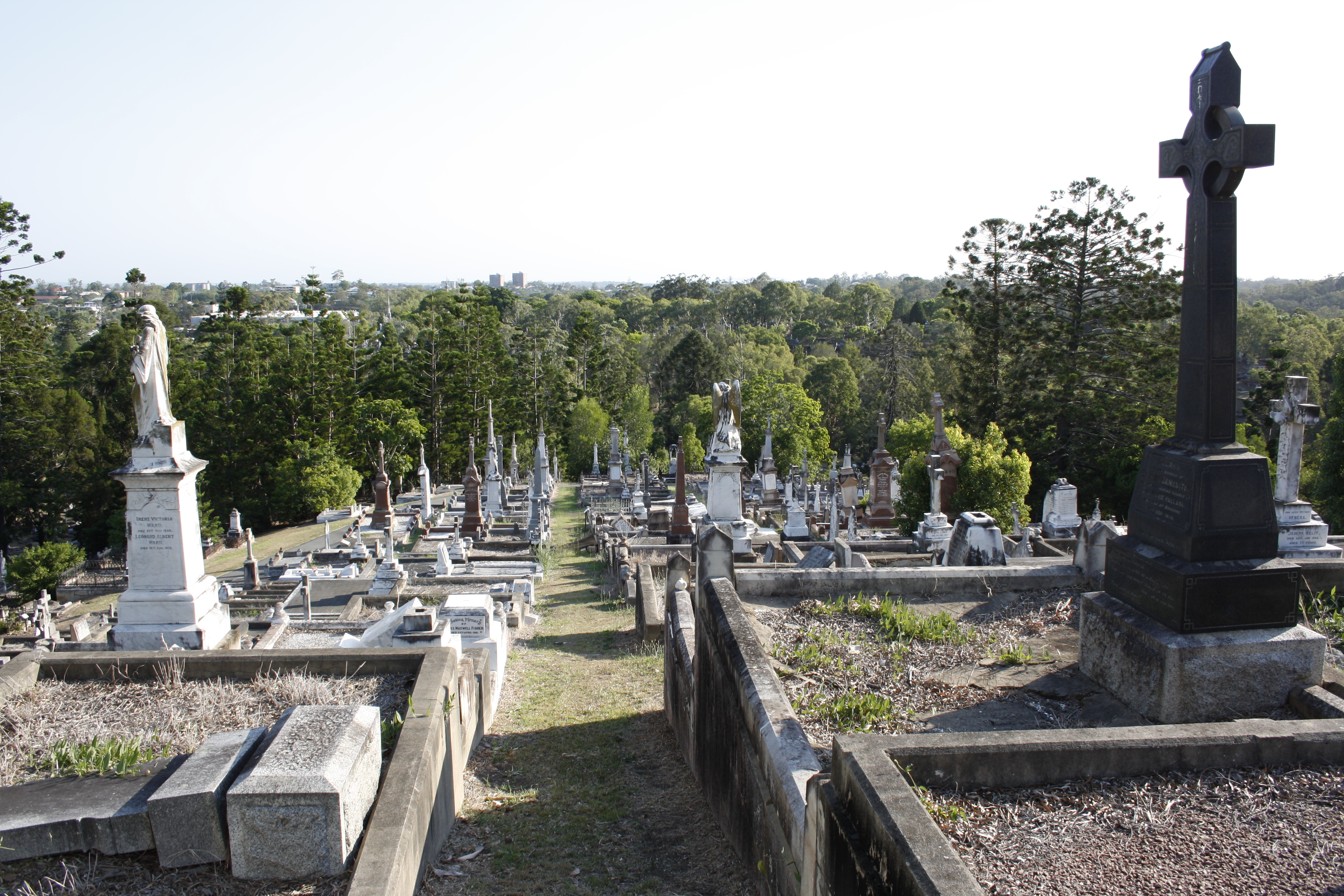
Brisbane General Cemetery

The Brisbane General Cemetery, planned in 1866 and formally opened in 1875, is Queensland's largest cemetery, placed on 437,300 square metres of land. It replaced Brisbane's second cemetery the North Brisbane Burial Grounds which were located in Milton where Suncorp Stadium stands today, closer to the centre of Brisbane. The remains of most of the 8500 people buried there are still under the stadium. The Brisbane General Cemetery, now called Toowong Cemetery, contains a signposted walk that provides information on various people buried therein.

The workshops and a bus depot of Transport for Brisbane is located at the western end of the suburb.

== Amenities ==
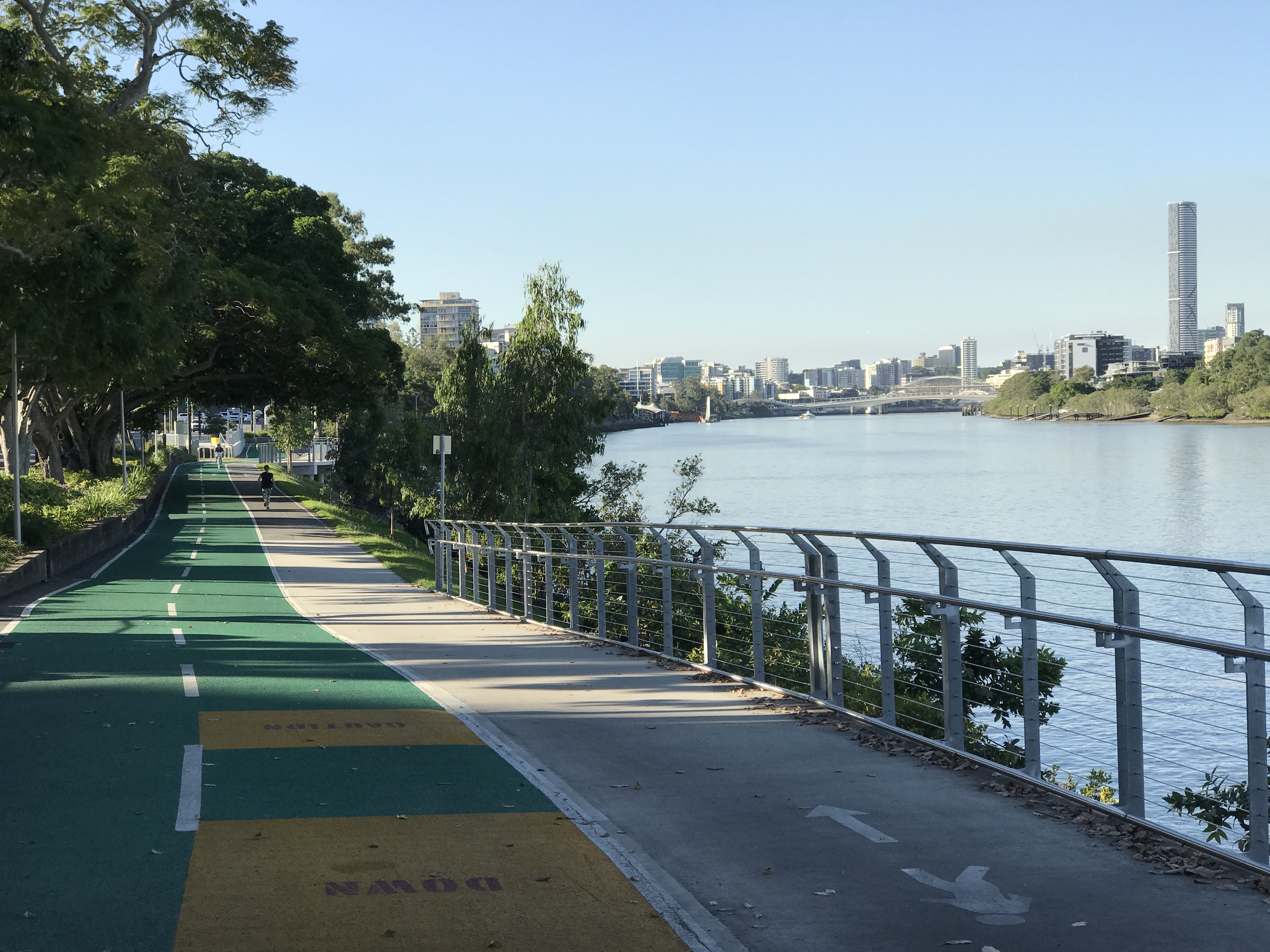
Bike and walkway along the Brisbane River.

Toowong has two historic hotels, the Regatta Hotel and the Royal Exchange Hotel. The three-storey Regatta hotel contained accommodation on the upper two floors and a public bar and lounge area on the ground floor. In 1965 a protest took place in the public bar of the Regatta Hotel when Merle Thornton (mother of Australian actress Sigrid Thornton) and Rosalie Bogner chained themselves to the bar in protest of public bars in Queensland being restricted to men only.

Built in 1986, Toowong Village is an office tower and shopping centre situated at the centre of Toowong. The blue glass office tower is a prominent landmark visible from Toowong and surrounding suburbs. The shopping centre situated on the lower levels of the office tower contains the Toowong Railway Station, Toowong Library operated by the Brisbane City Council, and the standard mix of retail stores.

Located on Sylvan Road, Toowong Memorial Park is a large park with gum trees, football ovals and a commanding view of the suburb. It was officially opened in 1918 in honour of those who enlisted from the Town of Toowong during the World War I. The park contains the Soldiers' Memorial on top of the hill was dedicated in 1922 and an RSL memorial is located near the Memorial gates on Sylvan Road, and also contains the Western Districts Rugby Football Club and a Basketball centre. Anzac Park is located next to the Western Freeway opposite the Toowong Cemetery. Originally the land was part of the cemetery grounds, but was converted to a rifle range in 1877. At the end of World War I the trees were planted in memory of the men from Toowong. The park land was proposed as a site for the Botanic Gardens, but the construction of the Western Freeway forced the move of the proposed site to its current location closer to Mount Coot-tha. The Mount Coot-tha Botanic Gardens and the Sir Thomas Brisbane Planetarium are located at the base of Mount Coot-tha.

The Toowong Municipal Library Building was built 1961 on Coronation Drive opposite the Toowong pool, and was formerly the district library for the western suburbs. The library was also designed by Brisbane City Chief Architect James Birrell, and is one of the few remaining examples of his work. The library is now used as commercial premises. The building comprises a two-storey library surrounded by trees and landscaped terraces, with cavity brick lower floor, the structure is formed by three intersecting circles. Above this base floor is a ‘floating’ crystalline form with 12 sided polygon (dodecagon) floor plan whose external walls taper outward as they rise and which houses the principal public floor of the library. The external steel wall framing of the upper floor is diagonally braced, and sheeted with plywood panels set within the structural framing and framed with silky oak beading. The library originally had a hemi-spherical skylight above its centre, which has now been replaced by an enclosure for mechanical equipment.

The library was threatened for closure in 1982 following the opening of a new municipal library at Indooroopilly in 1981. The Toowong Library did in fact close but local residents’ action saw it re-opened in 1983. Alterations were made to the building in 1983 when one of the rooms on the lower floor was acquired for use by the local councillor as a ward office, until 2005. Despite a campaign by local residents to prevent the closure of the library and redevelopment of the library and adjoining swimming pool site, the library was moved to Toowong Village shopping centre in March 2001, and the original building, which is protected by heritage listing, is now business premises.

== Community groups ==
Friends of Toowong Cemetery is a volunteer group that discover and share the history and stories of Toowong Cemetery. The group was formed in 1992 and its first President was Cr. Judy Magub OAM, the councillor for the Toowong ward from when it was formed in 1994 until she retired in 2007.

The West Toowong Community Association was formed in 1999 by a group of residents concerned about what they saw as increasing inappropriate development in the area. The group soon branched out to protect and develop community activities in the suburb. It has run several campaigns about development in the area including an unsuccessful attempt to prevent the demolition of the James Birrel designed Toowong Pool, and a successful campaign to prevent the construction of a mobile phone relay station tower within a residential area of West Toowong. It was also instrumental in successfully lobbying for the construction of a safe crossing over the Western Freeway at Toowong, which was hotly opposed by other Toowong's residents and prompted the creation of opposing associations. The overpass was eventually successfully built, providing safe access from Anzac Park to footpaths and cycle paths leading to Mt Cootha and other recreational areas.

The Vera Street Community Garden was formed in 2005 and operates as a community vegetable growing and creek rehabilitation group. Open to members of the public, it is located within the grounds of the Queensland Academy for Science, Mathematics and Technology (entrance via Vera St). This public garden is located on state government land, the former site of a Chinese market garden.

Western Group of the Brisbane City Unit of the Queensland State Emergency Service has its headquarters at Perrin Park in Josling Street (27.4908°S 152.9931°E). This site is shared with the Brisbane City Council Parks & Trees and the Toowong Community Meeting Place.

Toowong is home to one of the first four Scout troops in to be founded in Queensland in 1908. One hundred years on and Toowong has since merged with Milton & Taringa Scout troops but celebrates its 100 years as the oldest Scout troop in Queensland. Taring-Milton-Toowong Scout Troop is also known for their annual Scout rally which is one of the longest running Scout rallies in the world.

The Toowong branch of the Queensland Country Women's Association meets at the Toowong Library in the Toowong Village shopping centre at 9 Sherwood Road.

== Sport ==
The West Juniors Australian rules football club has its home ground at Oakman Park in Toowong.

Despite its name. Toowong FC (soccer club) has its home ground at Dunmore Park on the corner Roy and Evans Roads in neighbouring Auchenflower. The club consists of 17 kids teams [Age 4 Up], 3 Senior Women's Teams and 5 Senior Men's Teams.

The Western Districts Rugby Club (“The Bulldogs”) has its home grounds in Toowong Memorial Park, on Sylvan Road, alongside the train lines.

== Transport ==
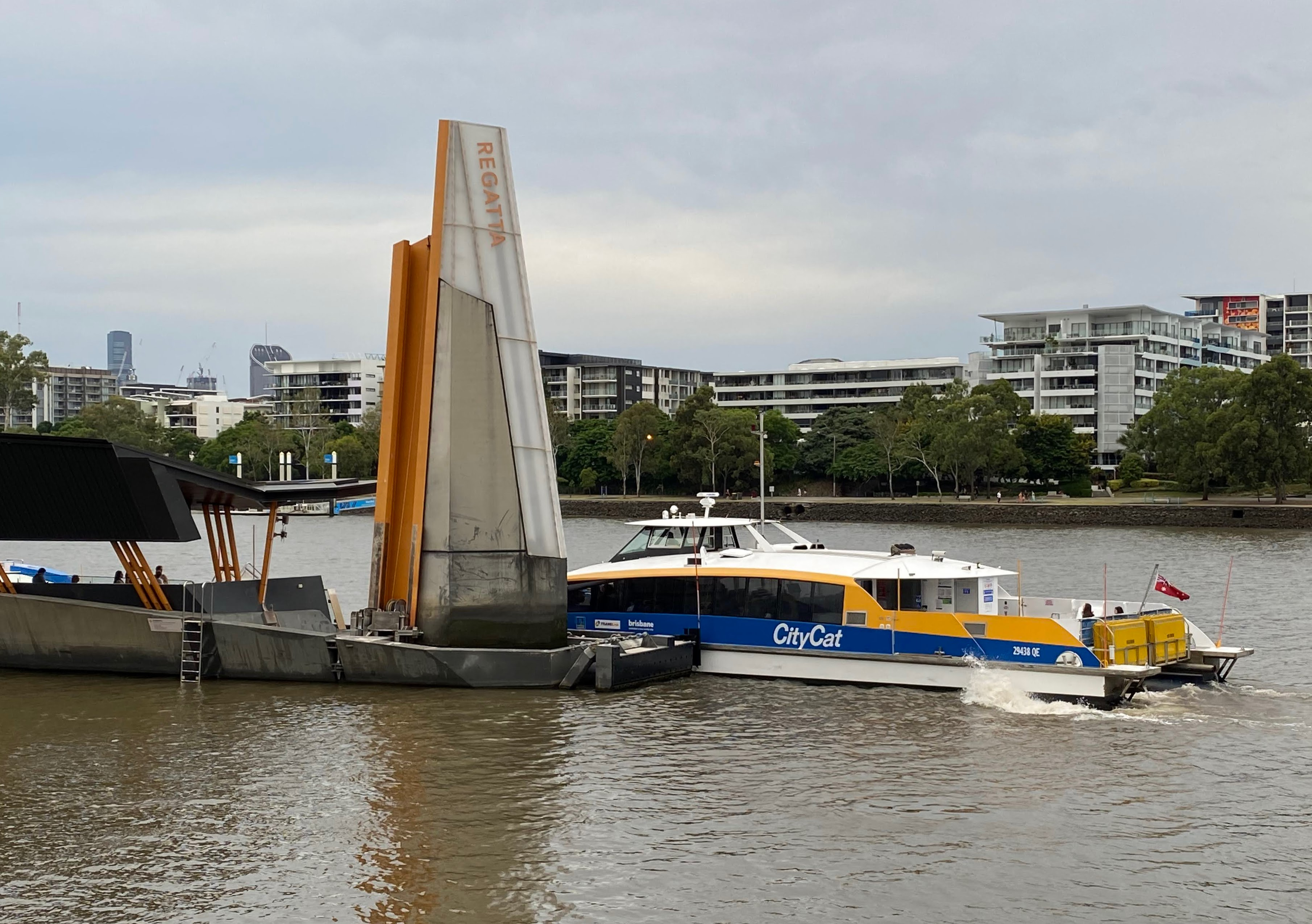
Regatta Ferry Terminal, Toowong

Toowong is a major transport node, with almost all bus and train routes passing through Toowong from the western suburbs.

By Train, The Toowong train station on the Ipswich Line and Springfield Line is located under Toowong Village.

By Bus, Buses travel along Coronation Drive from the city stopping on Benson Street and then on towards the University of Queensland, or stop on High Street outside the Royal Exchange Hotel and continue towards Indooroopilly and other western suburbs.

By Road, Toowong is accessed by Coronation Drive and Milton Road from the north, and by Moggill Road and the Western Freeway to the south and west. The main roads inside Toowong are High Street and Sherwood road.

By CityCat, the Regatta CityCat stop located outside the Regatta Hotel on Coronation Drive allows transport downstream towards the Brisbane CBD and upstream towards the University of Queensland

By Bicycle, Toowong two main bicycle paths, one that starts at Coronation Drive and proceed towards the University of Queensland and the second that again starts from Coronation Drive but runs to and along the Western Freeway.

== Politics ==
Toowong is within the:

- Brisbane City Council's Paddington Ward and Walter Taylor Ward
- Queensland Legislative Assembly's electoral district of Maiwar
- Australian Government's division of Ryan.

== In popular culture ==
Toowong is mentioned in the folksong Brisbane Ladies (c 1891) which begins:

Farewell and adieu to you, Brisbane ladies
Farewell and adieu, you maids of Toowong

== Notable people ==
Notable people with connections to Toowong include:

- Raymond Dart, anatomist and anthropologist, was born in Toowong in 1893.
- Bernard Fanning, lead vocalist of Australian band Powderfinger was born in Toowong on 15 August 1969.
- Janet Walker, costumier and dress-making bust inventor died in Toowong
- Ziggy the bagman, a homeless man who has been a controversial issue for Brisbane, slept on the streets of Toowong for many years.

== See also ==
- List of Brisbane suburbs
