= Ziggy (disambiguation) =

Ziggy is a masculine given name.

Ziggy may also refer to:

- Ziggy (comic strip), an American cartoon series created by Tom Wilson
- "Un garçon pas comme les autres (Ziggy)" (A Boy Unlike the Others (Ziggy)"), a 1993 song by Celine Dion
