= Warrawee, Brisbane =

Warrawee
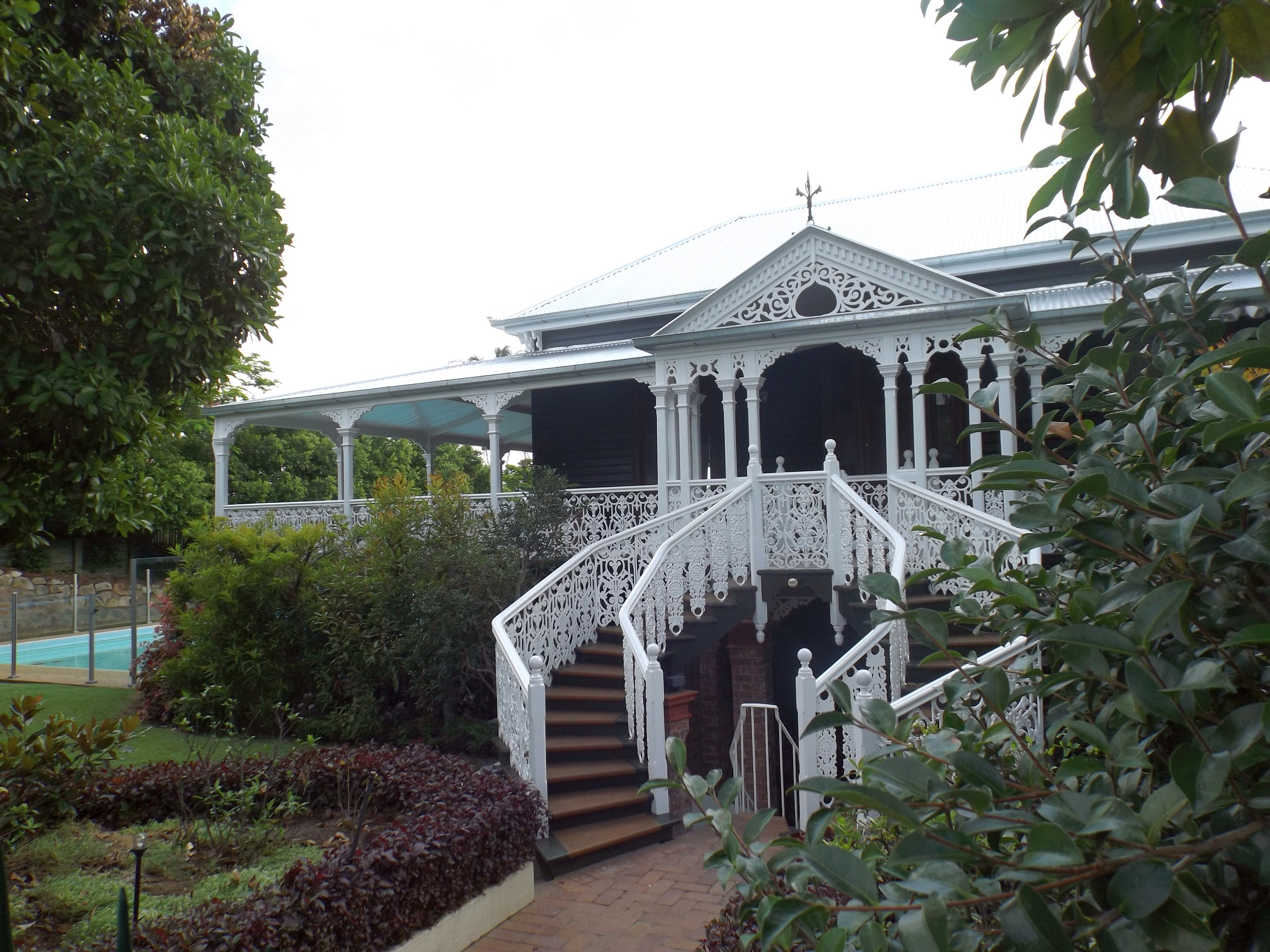
- Residence in 2014

- Location within Queensland Location within Australia
- 27.484°S 152.9821°E
- Location: 10 Dean Street, Toowong, City of Brisbane, Queensland, Australia

History
- Design period: 1870s–1890s (late 19th century)
- Built: c. 1885–
- Built for: Albert Henry White

Queensland Heritage Register
- Official name: Warrawee
- Type: state heritage (landscape, built)
- Designated: 21 October 1992
- Reference no.: 600332
- Significant period: 1880s (fabric, historical)
- Significant components: residential accommodation – main house, staircase/stairs – divided, basement / sub-floor, garden/grounds, ballroom

Warrawee is a heritage-listed detached house at 10 Dean Street, Toowong, City of Brisbane, Queensland, Australia. It was built from c. 1885 onwards. It was added to the Queensland Heritage Register on 21 October 1992.

== History ==
Warrawee is believed to have been built in the mid-1880s, for Albert Henry White, owner of the three acre site. E. John White, manager of the New Zealand Accident Insurance Company, was then in residence. In late 1886 the property was purchased by Alexander John Hunter, who does not appear as a resident until the 1892–93 directory, though a James Hunter is listed for 1891 and 1892. Apparently the property was rented during much of its lifetime. In 1924 John Mullan, a union organiser and politician, purchased the house on 2 roods 34.3 perches. The present owners purchased the property in 1986.

== Description ==
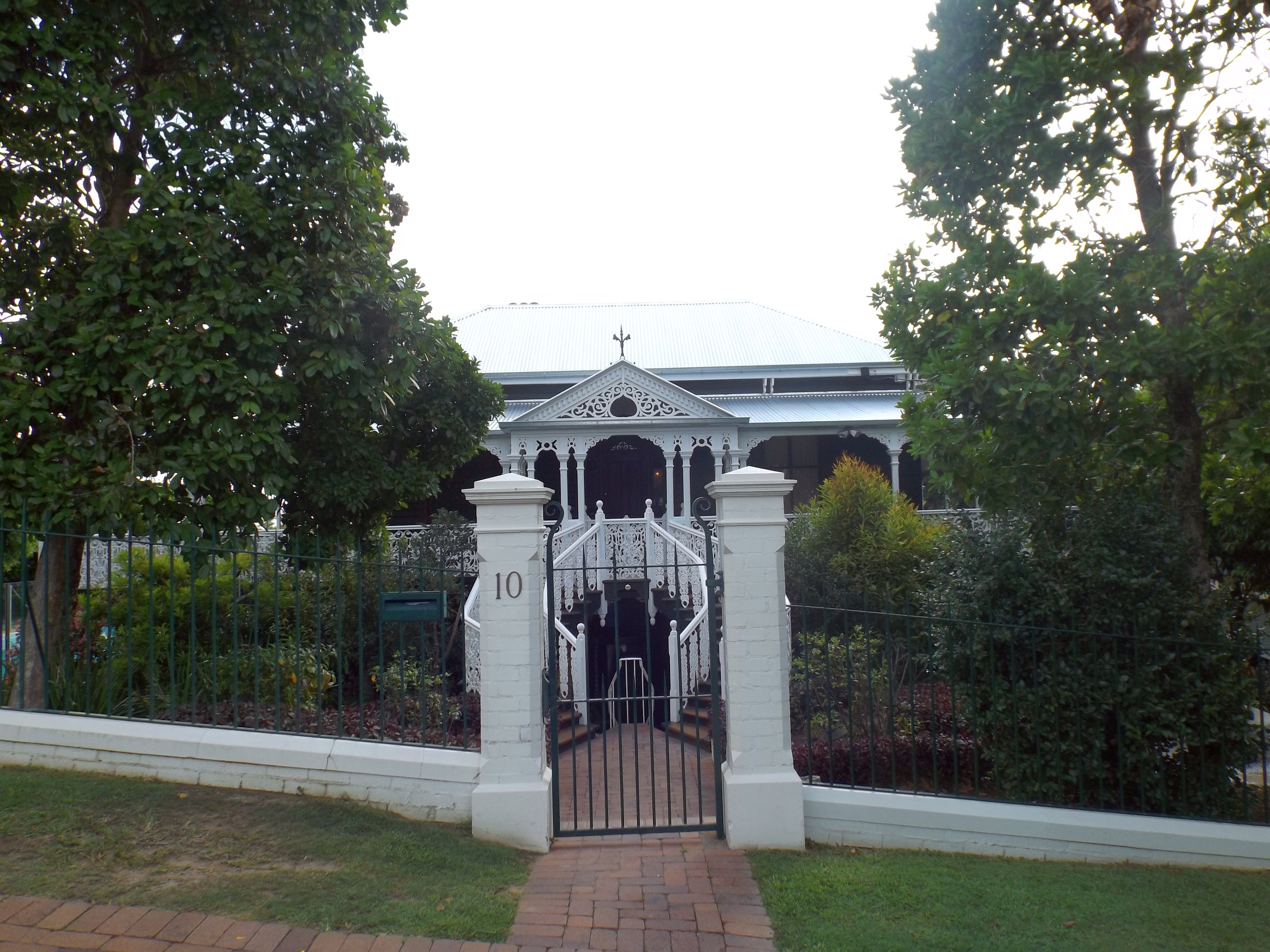
Entrance, 2014

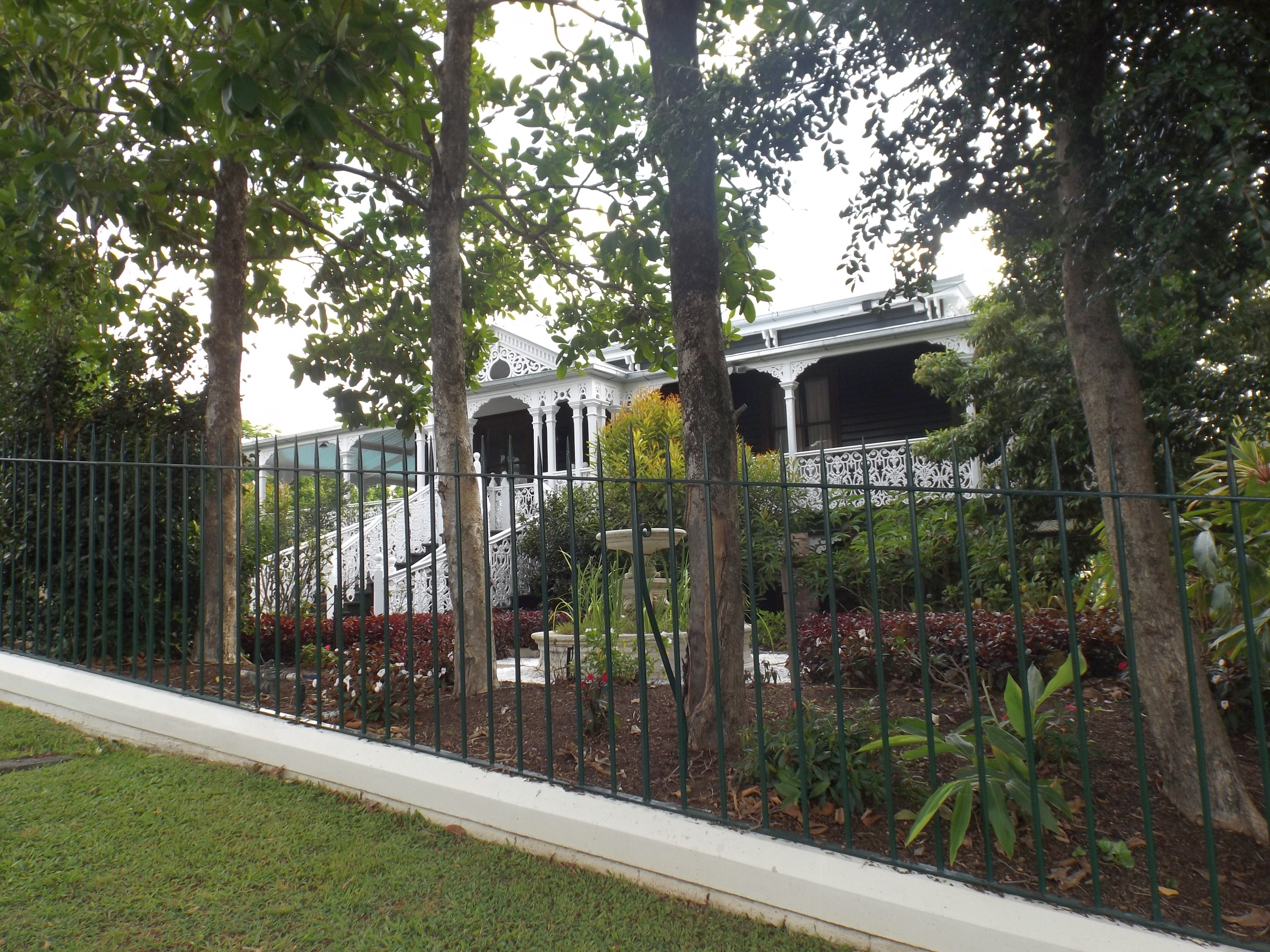
Surrounding gardens, 2014

Warrawee is a vernacular style residence, with a most impressive facade and a full sub-floor. The twelve foot wide verandahs have elegant cast-iron balustrading, and brackets and are lined underneath with ripple iron. The verandah portico with its intricate fretwork pediment, groups of columns, landing, gates and iron lace is quite spectacular, complemented by the twin curved stairs with their Scottish thistles in cast-iron panels.

The front verandah is supported by emphatic brick piers with elaborate capitals. Upstairs originally comprised a central hallway with two rooms on the left and three on the right, and a kitchen incorporated at the rear. The upstairs windows are all of the step-out sash type, and doors are of panelled cedar. The fanlights are casements with opaque, diamond pattern glass, though grooves suggest the former presence of fretwork panels.

The inside walls are lined internally with vertical joint boards and externally with chamferboards which are believed to have been milled locally at Pattersons, Toowong. Downstairs the unlined room on the left of the central corridor, which ran the length of the house, was reputedly the "ballroom". The righthand side originally comprised three rooms. Downstairs windows are all sashes, some being multi-paned.

== Heritage listing ==
Warrawee was listed on the Queensland Heritage Register on 21 October 1992 having satisfied the following criteria.

The place is important in demonstrating the evolution or pattern of Queensland's history.

During the boom of the 1880s, displays of wealth were common especially in the ornamental facades of public and commercial buildings. Warrawee is a more unusual domestic example of this phenomenon, particularly of the aspiring bourgeoisie.

Warrawee's grand display of columns, steps and cast-iron has long been admired by the local community.

This cakework facade has had an exceptional impact on the public mind, having been portrayed in various publication, prints, tours and media presentations.

The place is important in demonstrating the principal characteristics of a particular class of cultural places.

During the boom of the 1880s, displays of wealth were common especially in the ornamental facades of public and commercial buildings. Warrawee is a more unusual domestic example of this phenomenon, particularly of the aspiring bourgeoisie.

The place is important because of its aesthetic significance.

Warrawee's grand display of columns, steps and cast-iron has long been admired by the local community.

The place has a strong or special association with a particular community or cultural group for social, cultural or spiritual reasons.

This cakework facade has had an exceptional impact on the public mind, having been portrayed in various publication, prints, tours and media presentations.
