= Zygi (given name) =

Zygi is a given name. Notable people with the name include:

- Zygi Kamasa (born 1969), Swedish-British entertainment studio executive and film executive producer
- Zygi Wilf (born 1950), German-born American real estate developer

== See also ==
- Ziggy
