= Siggy =

Siggy or Siggie may refer to:

- Siggy Flicker, born Sigalit Paldie, relationship coach and cast member of The Real Housewives of New Jersey (2016–2018)
- Sigmund "Siggy" Jackson, Jr. (born 1977), third generation member of the musical Jackson family
- Carol Kendall (writer) (1917-2012), American writer of children's books nicknamed "Siggy"
- Sigurd Lucassen (1927–2001), American labor leader
- Siggie Nordstrom (1893-1980), American model, actress, entertainer, socialite and lead singer of The Nordstrom Sisters
- Sigurd "Siggy" Olaisen, member of the Norwegian thrash metal band Battered
- Siggy, a major character on the American television series Vikings
- an abbreviation for signature block, a block of text automatically appended at the bottom of an email message, Usenet article, or forum post

== See also ==
- Zips or Siggies, a slang term often used as a derogatory slur by Italian American and Sicilian American mobsters
- Siggies, colloquial term for British Army Royal Corps of Signals units
- Ziggy (disambiguation)
