= Temple of Peace (Toowong Cemetery) =

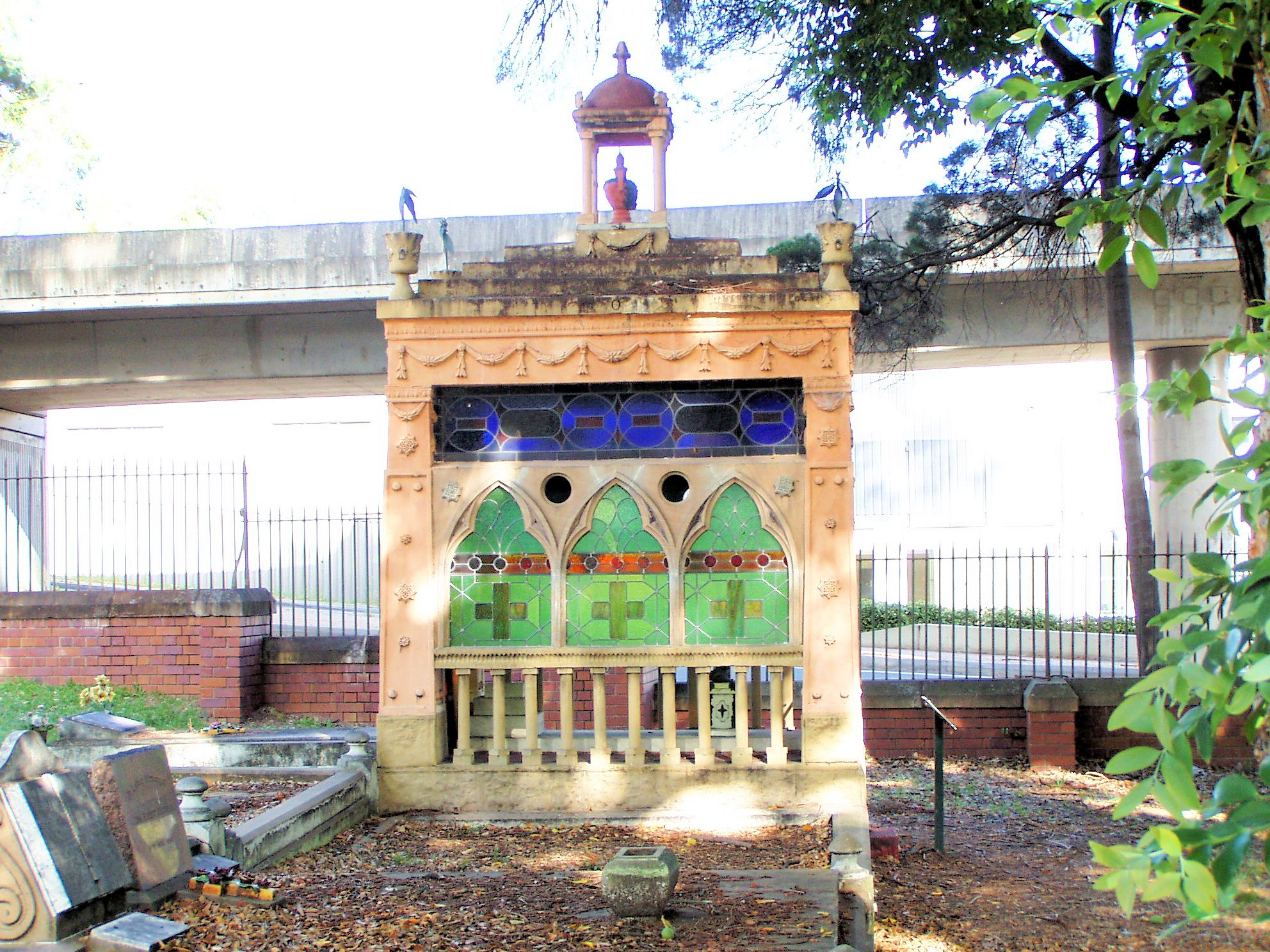
- Temple Of Peace, 2003

- Location within Queensland
- 27.4744°S 152.9825°E
- Location: Corner of Frederick Street and Mt Coot-tha Road, Toowong, City of Brisbane, Queensland, Australia

History
- Design period: 1919–1930s (interwar period)
- Built: 1924–1924

Site notes
- Architect: Richard Ramo

Queensland Heritage Register
- Official name: Temple of Peace
- Type: state heritage (built)
- Designated: 21 October 1992
- Reference no.: 600334
- Significant period: 1924 (fabric, historical)
- Significant components: sculpture, sarcophagus, gate/s, memorial – mausoleum
- Builders: Richard Ramo

Temple of Peace is a heritage-listed memorial in the Toowong Cemetery at the corner of Frederick Street and Mt Coot-tha Road, Toowong, City of Brisbane, Queensland, Australia. It was designed and built in 1924 by Richard Paul Carl Ramo in memory of his four sons, three of whom were allegedly killed in World War I. It was added to the Queensland Heritage Register on 21 October 1992.

== History ==
Located close to the main entrance to the cemetery, the Temple of Peace was erected in 1924 by Richard Ramo as a memorial to his four sons, three of whom had died in the First World War (1914–18). They were:

- Victor – killed at Messines in August 1915
- Henry – Died of wounds in Belgium in October 1915
- Gordon – killed at Gallipoli in November 1915
- (foster son) Ferdinand Christian (Fred) Borell – died on 28 November 1923 in the rear of Richard Ramo's store at 180 Roma Street, Brisbane, as a result of a gunshot wound.

Such was Richard Ramo's grief at these losses that he designed and built the temple as the last resting place of Fred's body and the ashes of two of his soldier sons. The body of Ramo's dog, which had been poisoned, also was interred in the memorial. The temple was more than just a personal memorial, it was an expression of revulsion of war, containing many pacifist and anti-war inscriptions.

A dedication ceremony was conducted on 6 December 1924 and was attended by several thousand people, many of them socialists, pacifists, and members of the Industrial Workers of the World. A band played "The Red Flag" as a coffin was placed in the memorial.

However, researchers have been unable to confirm Ramo's claims of three sons dying in World War I. Ramo was an immigrant from Prussia who changed his name from Karl Retzlaff. He had three sons with his wife, Elsie, one of whom enlisted under the Anglicised name of Gordon Redcliff and died on 1 November at Gallipoli as Ramo claimed. According to the Commonwealth War Graves Commission he is buried at Shrapnel Valley Cemetery in Gallipoli. However, there is no evidence in relation to either the births, military service or deaths of sons Victor and Henry as Ramo claimed, and historian Judith Mackay has declared that "the other two [sons] are complete inventions". Ramo did have other two sons, Percy and Cecil, but neither died during the war. Cecil enlisted under the name Cecil John Valentine Raymo and Percy Redcliff did not enlist. All of Ramo's sons were estranged from Ramo as Ramo had deserted the family when they were children. In a series of reports in The Sunday Mail in 2001, the Temple of Peace was declared by the newspaper a "fake".

== Description ==
The memorial is in the form of a mausoleum, 2.76 metres (9 ft 1 in) long, 1.76 metres (5 ft 9 in) wide and 3 metres (9.8 ft) high. It is constructed of stone and plaster.

Four corner columns support a stepped roof which is surmounted by a miniature mausoleum containing an urn with wreath and flame in the form of a lamp of remembrance. The corner finials are in the form of classical urns and festoons.

Each side of the memorial has a pillared marble balustrade. Above this is a row of three leadlight gothic style windows. A rectangular leadlight runs along the top of all the walls. The rear wall is mostly covered with inscribed marble tablets while the front of the memorial is open with metal gates. A black metal dove with olive leaves in its mouth, a symbol of peace, sits over the entrance.

The interior contains a sarcophagus surmounted by the carved figure of a dog. Both the interior and exterior have numerous leaded memorial and pacifist inscriptions.

At the bottom of the entrance is the inscription "All my hope lies buried here".

== Heritage listing ==
Temple of Peace was listed on the Queensland Heritage Register on 21 October 1992 having satisfied the following criteria.

The place is important in demonstrating the evolution or pattern of Queensland's history.

The Temple of Peace, erected in 1924, is significant historically as a uniquely different war memorial in form and purpose, and as an expression of pacifist sentiment within a war memorial.

The place is important in demonstrating the principal characteristics of a particular class of cultural places.

Illustrative of one family's loss in war, it is a powerful evocation of the impact of war on the Australian community.

The place is important because of its aesthetic significance.

It is of significance for its unusual and extravagant design and embellishments, and its aesthetic appeal.

== Gallery ==
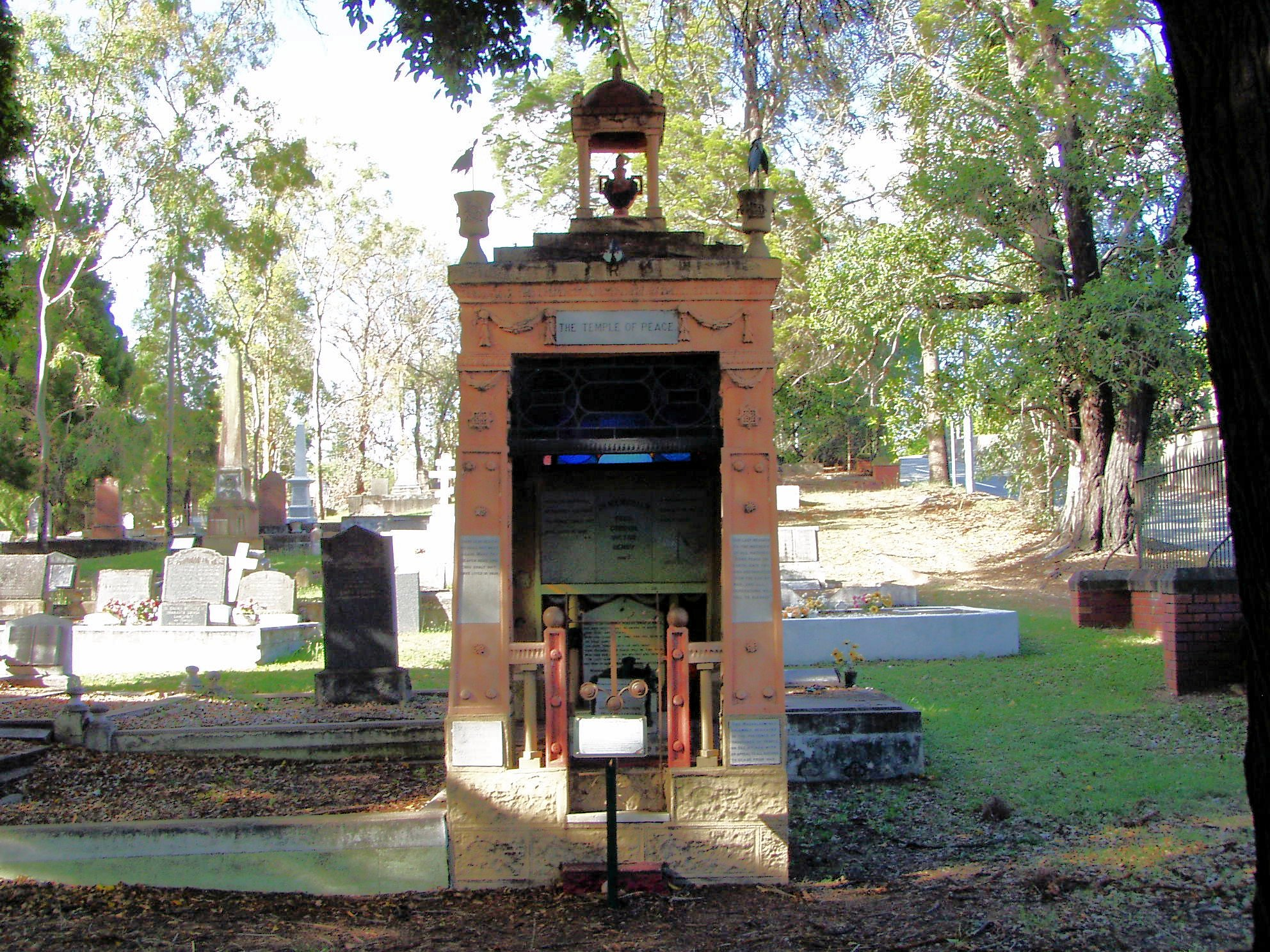

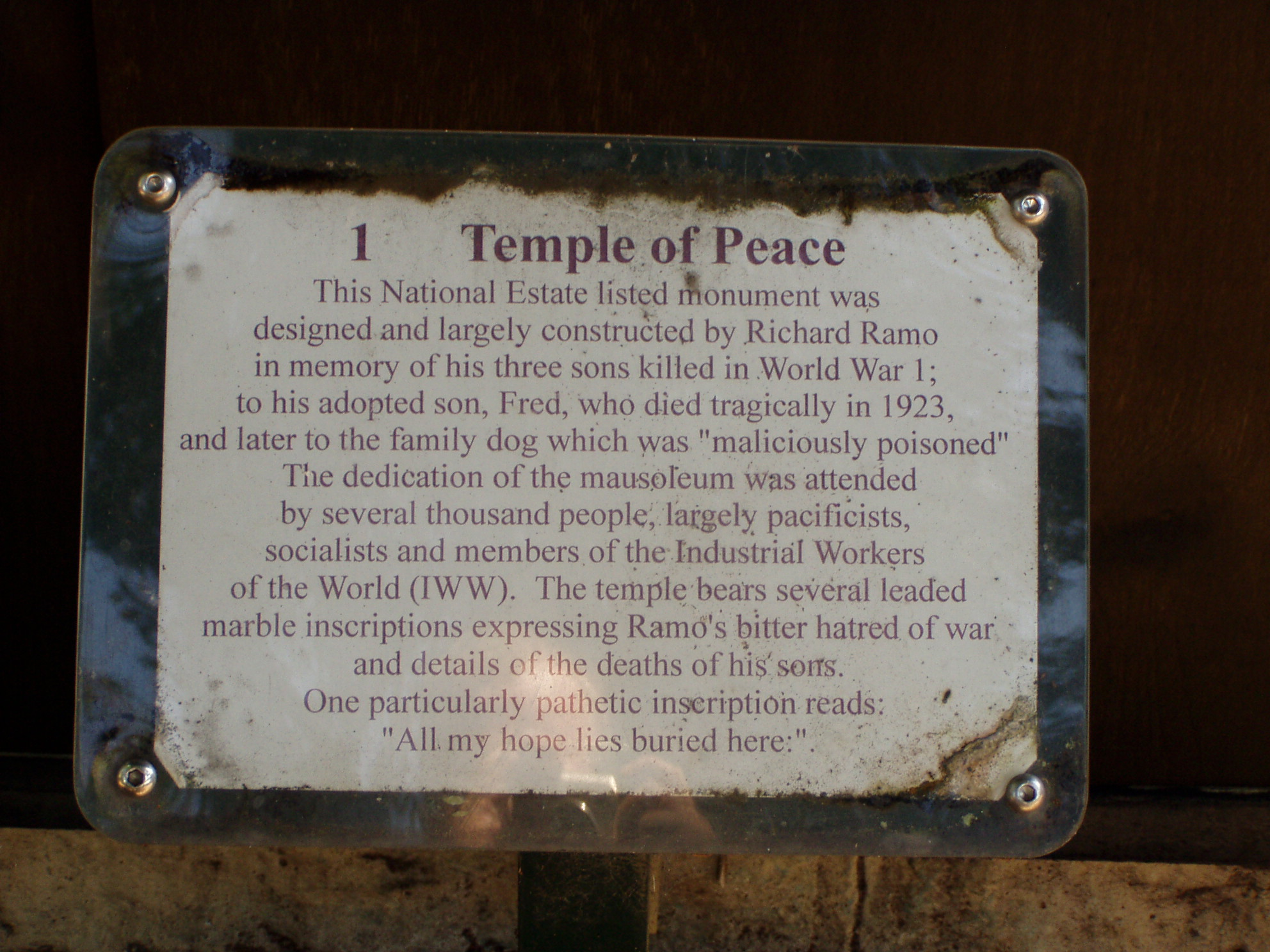

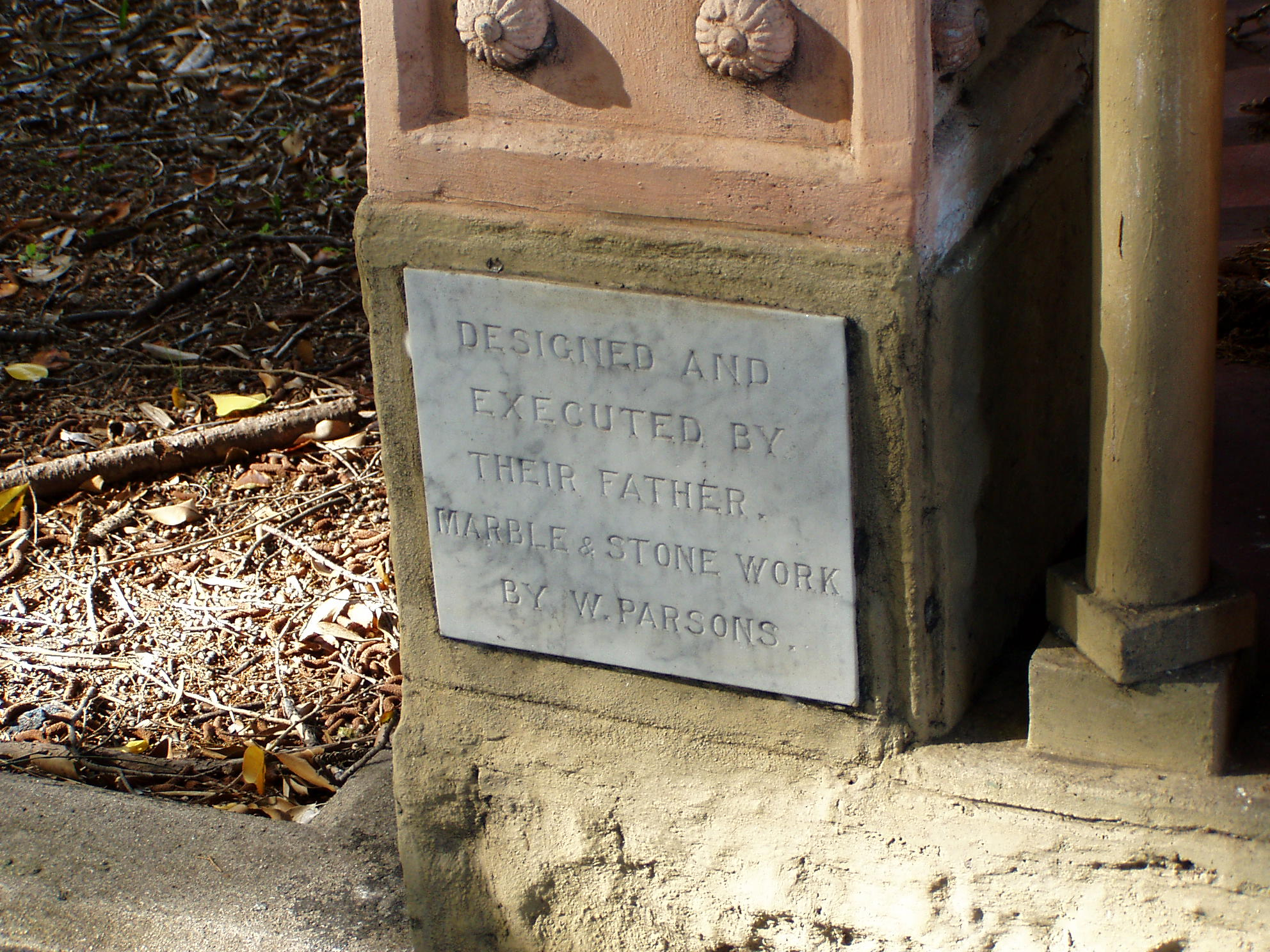

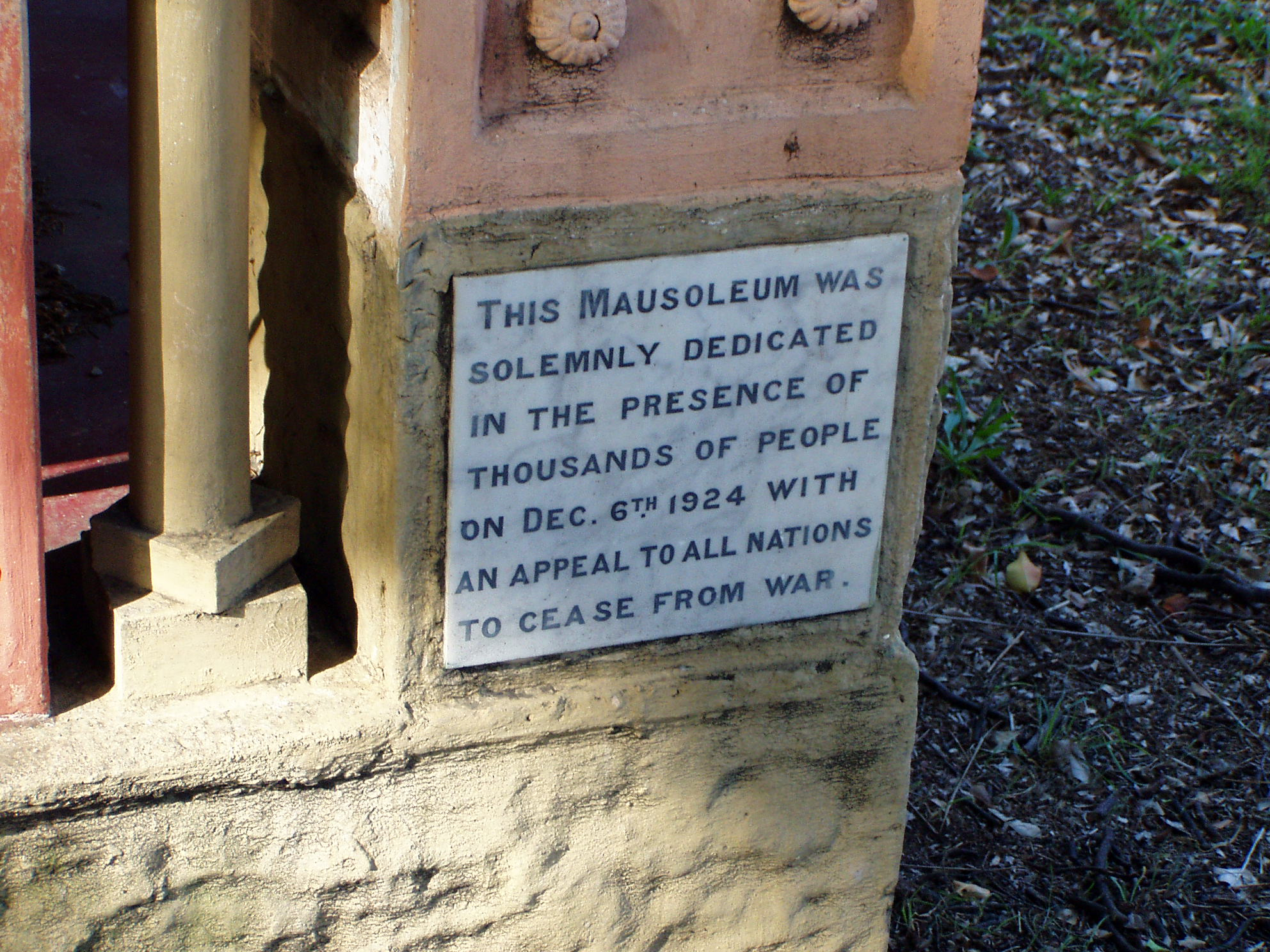

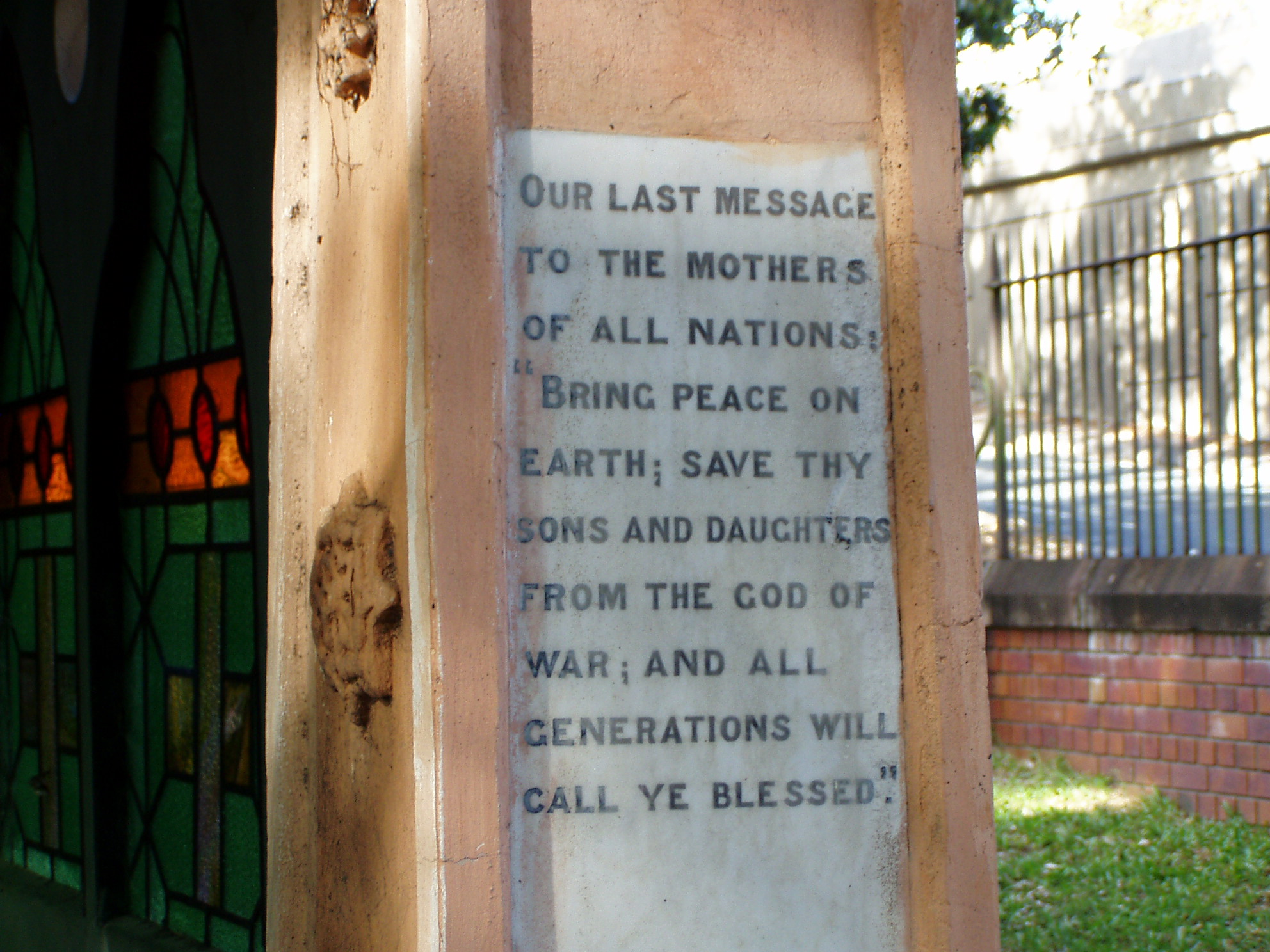

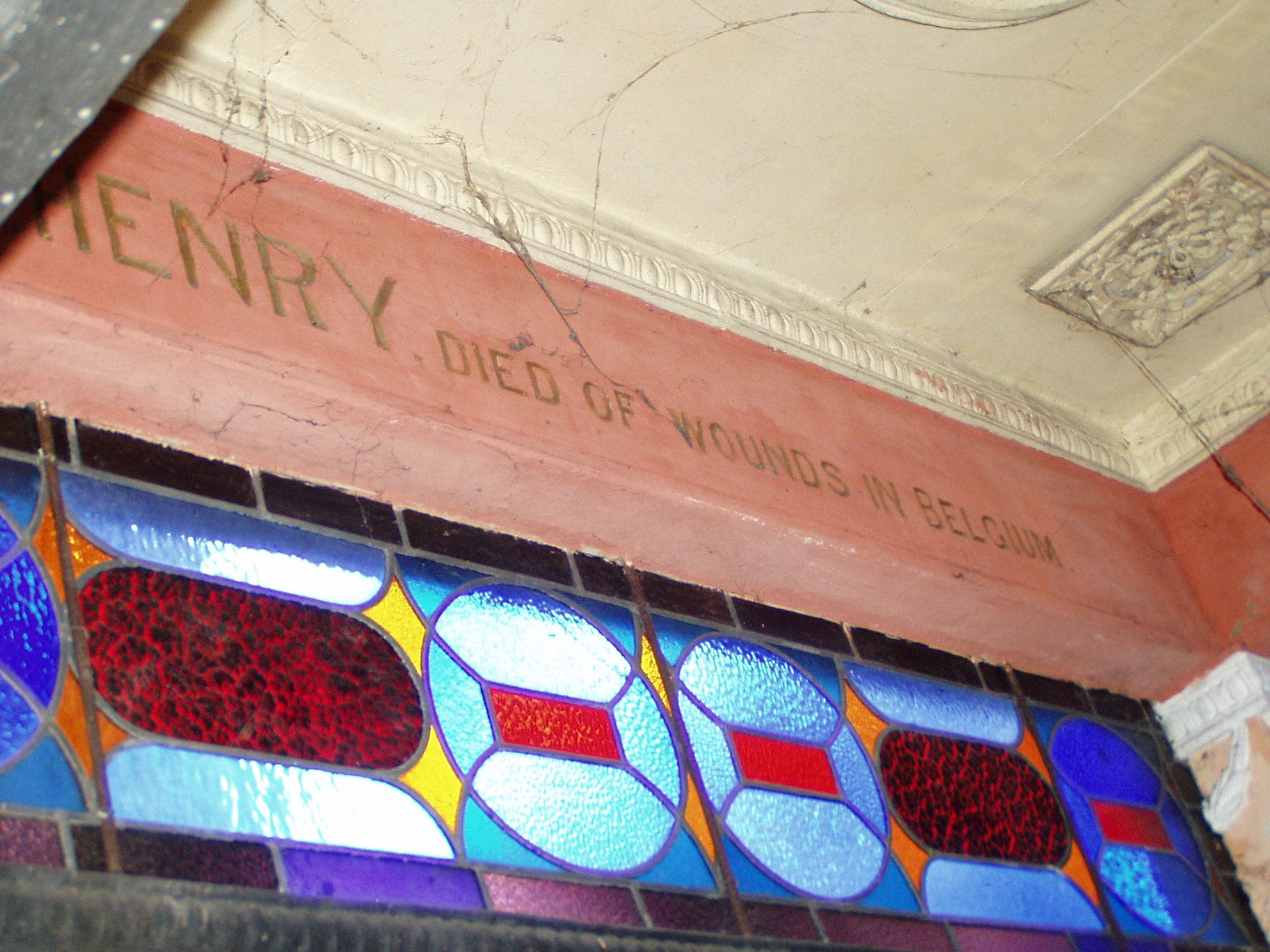

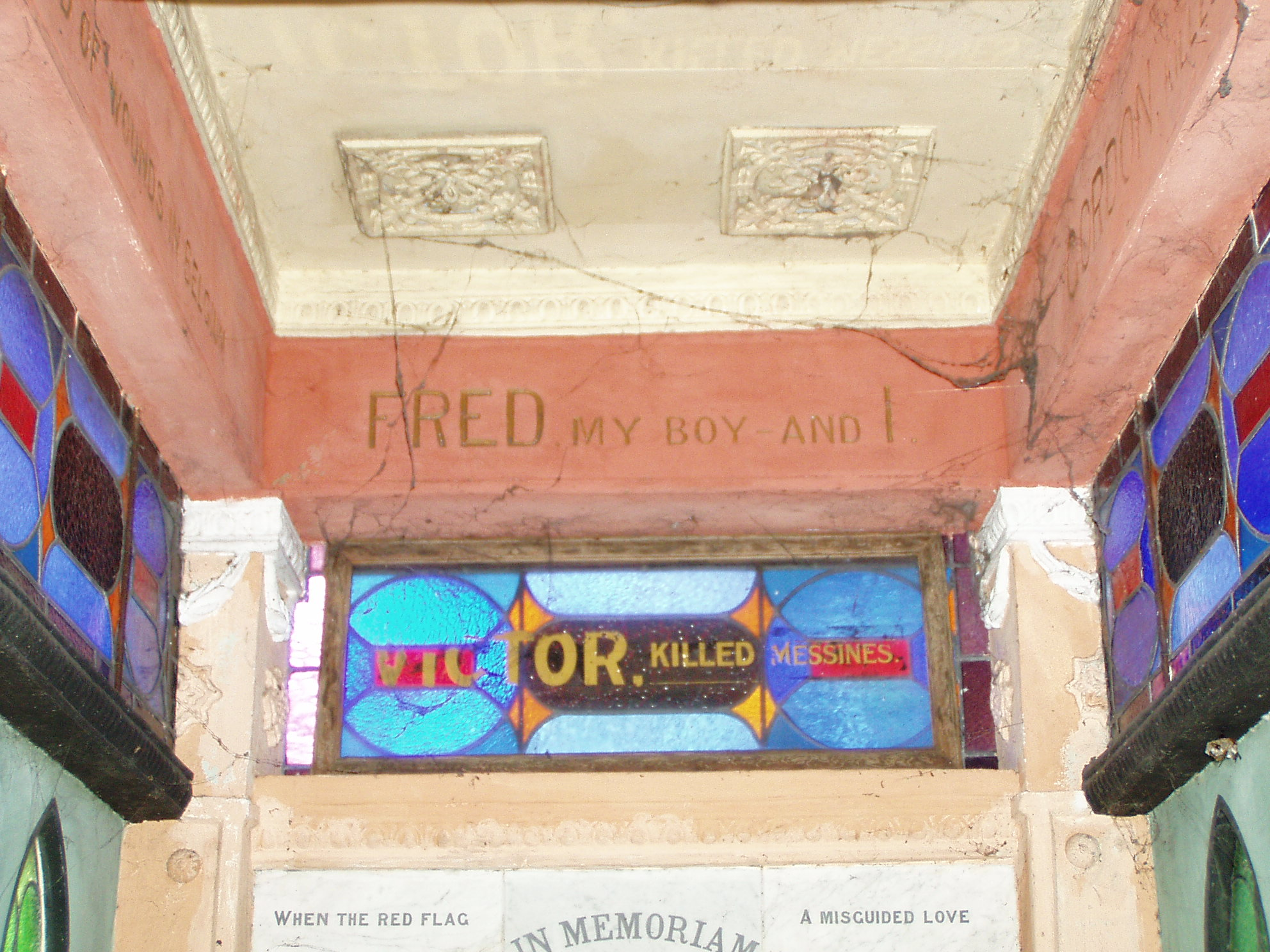

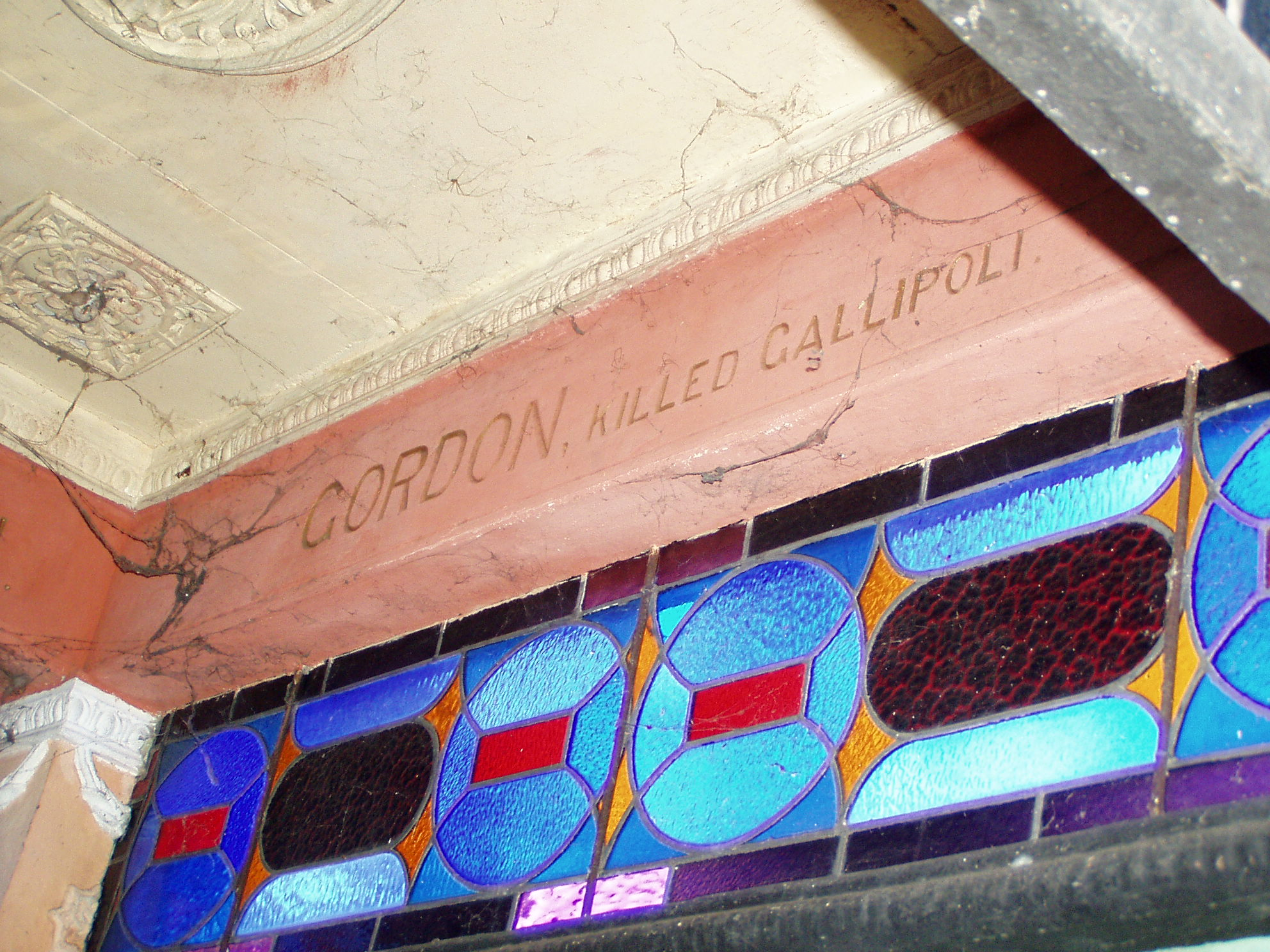

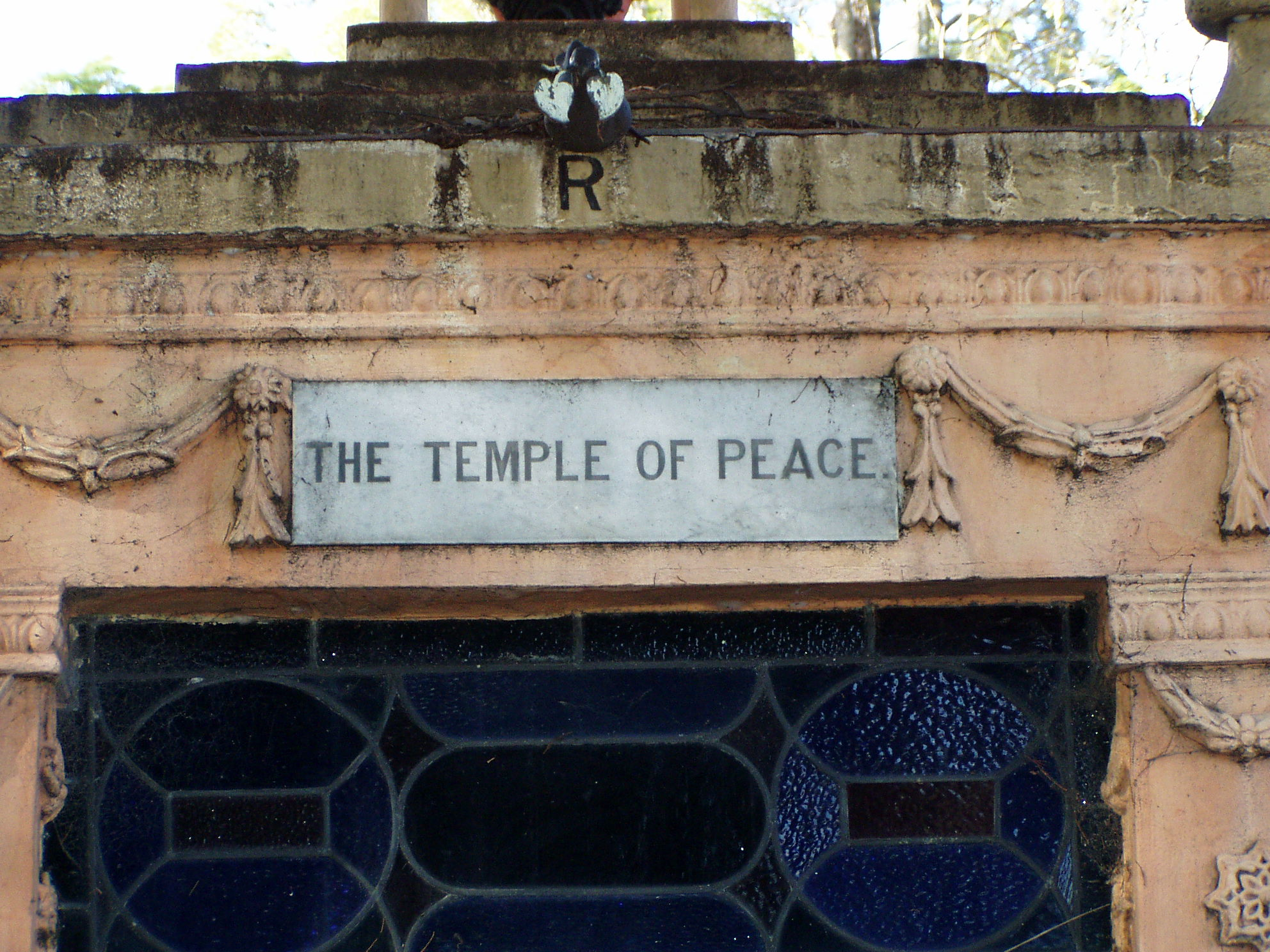

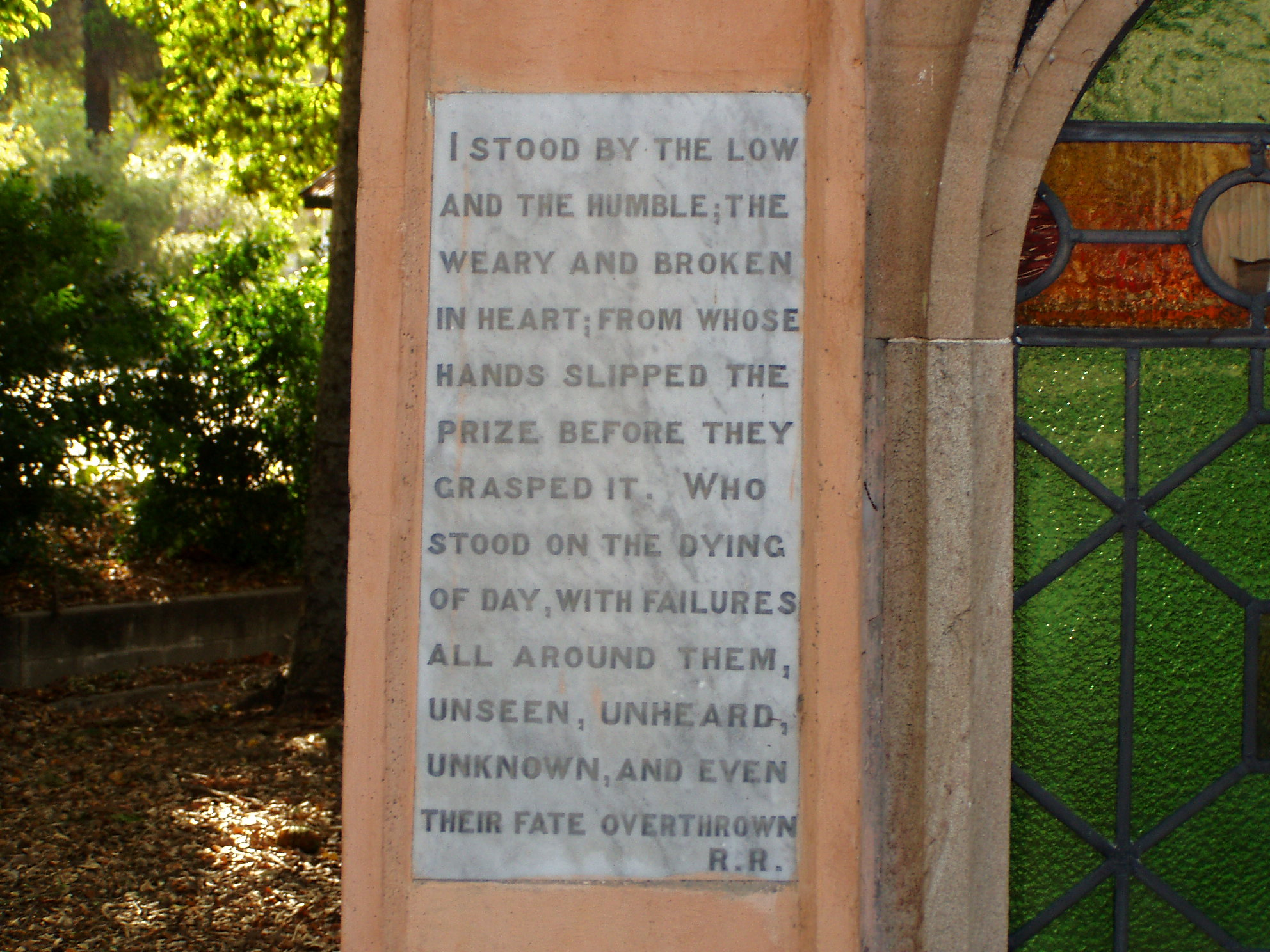

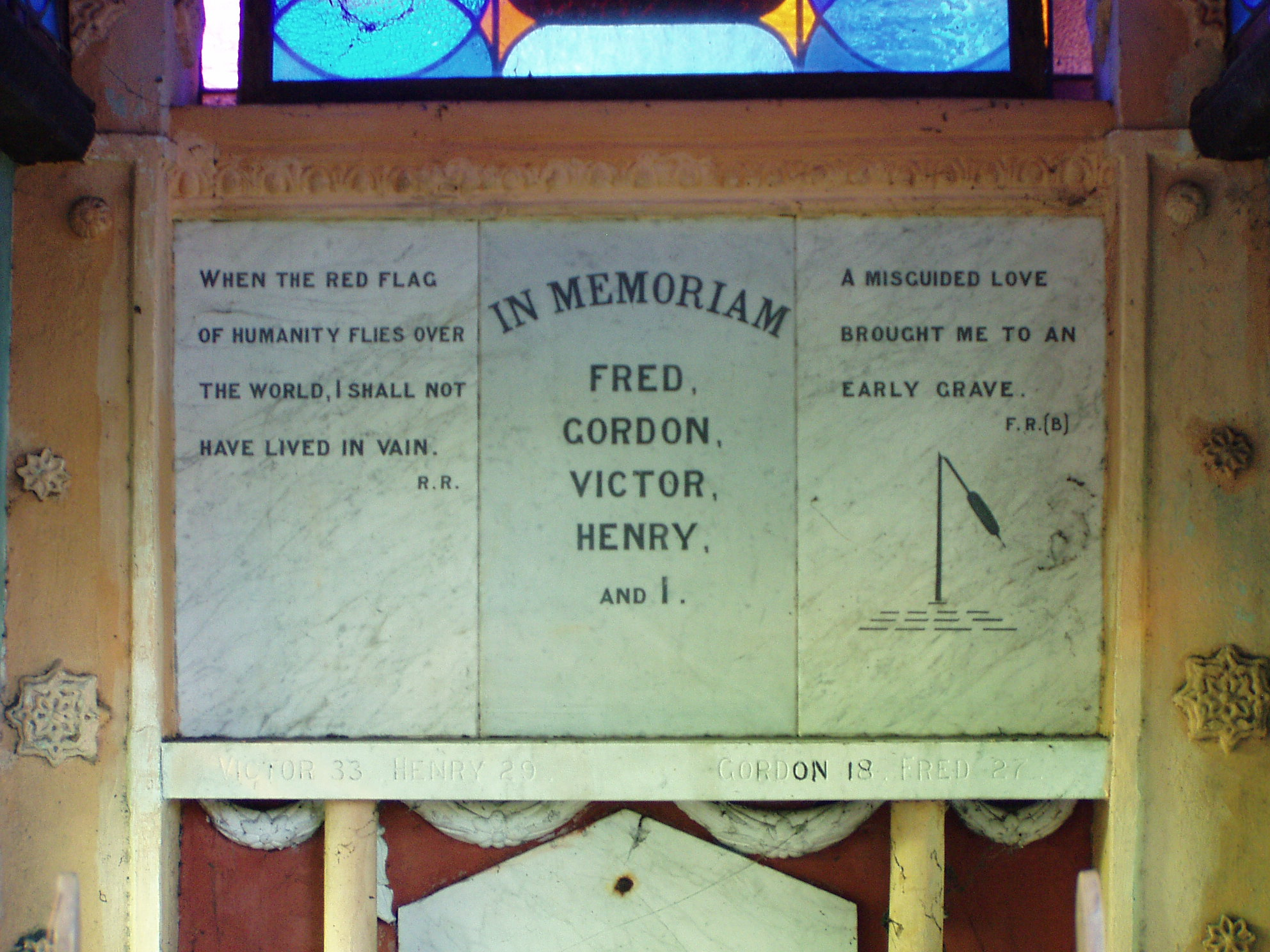
