= Ziggy the Bag Man =

Australian homeless celebrity

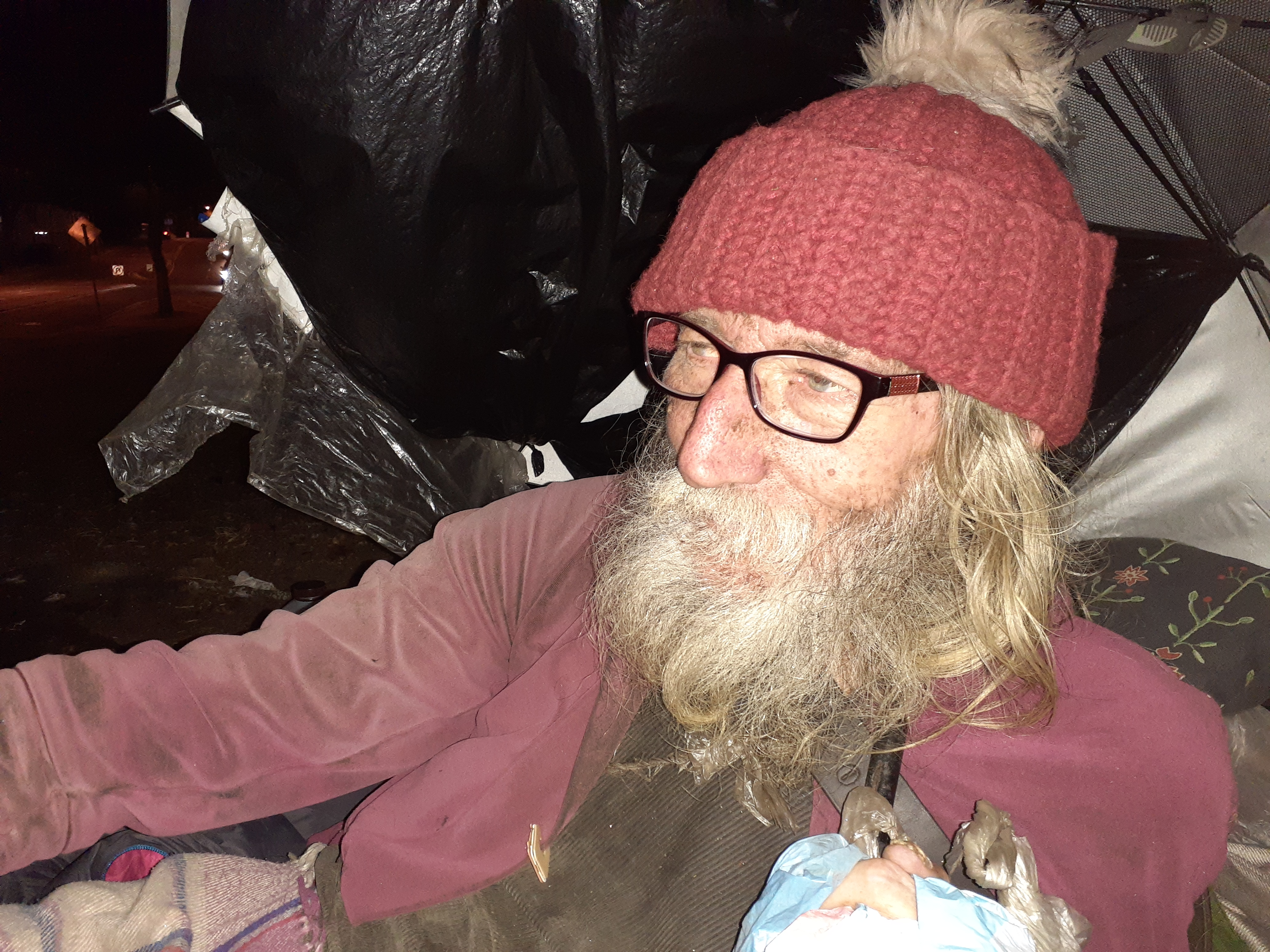
Wilczek in 2020

Zbigniew Marian Wilczek, also known as Ziggy the Bag Man (born c. 1961), is a man who lives in a park in the inner Brisbane suburb of Taringa. Ziggy objects to being labelled as "homeless" as he chose his situation and does not ask for food, money or clothing. He enjoys living in a public park. Ziggy gained press coverage in 2004, becoming a controversial issue in two consecutive local elections.

== Biography ==
Zbygnew Wilczek was born c. 1960-61 and is of a Polish nationality.

He entered public view in the year 2000 with the then Lord Mayor Jim Soorley addressing the complaints of some local businesses who said that Wilczek's activities attracted rats and discouraged customers.

Early in 2004 he was the subject of "Operation Ziggy", an effort by ABC presenter (from 612 AM) Spencer Howson to find him a home. After being interviewed on air, it was revealed that Zbigniew was not so willing to be a party to this scheme and so the plan collapsed.

In 2004, three men threw homemade bombs at Ziggy over a period of six months resulting in Ziggy suffering burns on at least one occasion. The men were jailed in 2006 on charges of stalking with violence.

Later that year a portrait of him painted by local artist Bruce Chapman was entered in the Archibald Prize. His only requested payment was $8 worth of food, including ice cream, several biscuits and a bottle of soft drink. Zbigniew also gave an interview for a similar fee of $10.

In December 2005, several bins of plastic bags in his possession were confiscated by police and Ziggy was ordered to relocate from his High Street encampment.

In July 2006 Zbigniew moved on from his High Street location to a new spot at Oakman Park. Radio News reported that he moved because of attacks at his old location. As of 2008, he was based near Toowong Creek. In 2022, ABC News confirmed his status and stay at Morrow Street Park, situated between Morrow Street and Moggill Road.
