= Richard McLean Badger =

Richard McLean Badger (4 May 1896 – 26 November 1974) was an American professor at Caltech and a chemist who specialized in molecular spectroscopy with X rays and infrared radiation. He made pioneering studies on the modes of vibrations and spectral energies in small molecules. The so called Badger's rule relating force and internuclear distance in diatomic molecules is based on his work from 1933.

Badger was born in Elgin, Illinois to Joseph Stillman who worked at General Electric, and Carrie Mabel Hewitt. Badger spent his early life Brisbane, Australia, where his father developed its tramway network. He was then sent to school at Elgin grammar school and again briefly in Australia. He joined Northwestern University in 1916 but was posted into the US Army 311th Field Station Battalion in World War I and was demobilized in 1919. He then went to California to continue his education at the Throop Institute of Technology which became the California Institute of Technology (Caltech) in the next year. He studied crystals using X ray diffraction and was influenced by Richard C. Tolman, Roscoe G. Dickinson, Paul S. Epstein, and Arthur A. Noyes. He received a PhD in 1924 and continued to work as a research fellow. Badger and Tolman worked on examining predictions based on Niels Bohr's ideas. In 1928-29 he visited universities in Germany and studied fluorescence with James Franck in Göttingen. He also worked with Reinhard Mecke in Bonn. He became an assistant professor in 1929 and began to examine hydrogen bonds in organic molecules. During World War II he was also involved in problems coming from the Manhattan Project. He worked alongside Linus Pauling working on Navy sponsored research but he did not share Pauling's pacifism and anti-nuclear testing stance.

Badger married Virginia Alice Sherman in 1933 and they had a son and a daughter.

The Badger family home in Brisbane is now heritage-listed.
