= Endrim, Woodstock Road tram shed, and tram track =

- Location within Queensland
- 27.4840°S 152.9845°E
- Location: 6 & 28 Woodstock Road, Toowong, City of Brisbane, Queensland, Australia

History
- Design period: 1900–1914 (Early 20th century)
- Built: 1906, 1924

Queensland Heritage Register
- Official name: Endrim and the Woodstock Road Tram Shed and Track; Arlington; 'Boss' Badger's residence
- Type: state heritage
- Designated: 23 March 2018
- Reference no.: 650071
- Type: Residential: Detached house; Transport-rail: Tramway; Transport-rail: Tramway station / waiting shed
- Theme: Moving goods, people and information: Using rail; Building settlements, towns, cities and dwellings: Dwellings
- Builders: Brisbane City Tramways Council Department

Endrim, Woodstock Road tram shed, and tram track are a heritage-listed group consisting of a house, a tramway and a tramway stop at 6 & 28 Woodstock Road, Toowong, City of Brisbane, Queensland, Australia. They were built in 1906 by the Brisbane Tramways Company Limited. Endrim is also known as Arlington and "Boss" Badger's residence. It was added to the Queensland Heritage Register on 23 March 2018.

== History ==
Endrim (originally Arlington), the Woodstock Road tram shed, and tram track are located in Toowong, approximately 6 km (3.7 mi) west of the Brisbane CBD. It is at the Toowong terminus of a former passenger tram line, completed by the Brisbane Tramway Company in 1904. Endrim is a residence built above the Toowong terminus in 1906 by the Brisbane Tramway Company for its general manager Joseph Stillman "Boss" Badger. The passenger waiting shelter shed was built at the terminus in 1924 by the Brisbane Tramway Trust at the request of the Toowong Progress Association. Together they demonstrate the evolution of Brisbane's settlement and the influence of the Brisbane tramway system and Joseph Badger on the spread of suburban development.

Passenger trams began operating in Brisbane after the Tramways Act 1882 was passed, allowing a local authority or private company to construct, maintain and operate a tramway. The Metropolitan Tramways Company (MTC) was granted a construction order for a line from Woolloongabba to Breakfast Creek in April 1884. Steel rails were ordered from English steelworks Dick Kerr and Co, laid from January 1885, and full services started in May 1886. Residents petitioned the company to extend tramlines to the suburbs, with lines opened to Bulimba, New Farm and Boundary Street in 1886. In 1892, after a legislative amendment, MTC received permission to convert the tramway system to electric power. However, the company encountered major financial difficulties, and shareholders agreed to sell MTC in December 1893.

The Brisbane Tramways Company (BTC), created by a London syndicate in 1895, purchased the MTC later that year and took over tram operations. It quickly embarked on electrifying the tramway system, engaging American company General Electric (GE), which sent engineer Joseph Stillman Badger to Brisbane to oversee the project. Badger had commenced his career in telephones before moving to railway engineering for the Edison Company in 1890. Intending to make the Brisbane tramway system "an exhibition one for Australia", Badger ran the first electric tram on 21 June 1897, just over a year after his arrival. Badger accepted the position of General Manager of BTC and moved his wife Carrie and two sons to Brisbane. Their first home was Bellevue, a rented house on Miskin Street, Toowong.

Under Badger's management, the electric tramway system expanded across Brisbane. Horse-drawn tram rails were replaced with weightier rails, accommodating heavier rolling stock. Local councils petitioned BTC for extensions to encourage settlement in previously undeveloped suburbs. Tramlines could reach areas not serviced by railways, and the mere promise of a tram service sparked land sales and population growth. Between 1898 and 1900, lines were extended to Paddington, New Farm, Ascot, West End and Ipswich Road.

An extension to Toowong was discussed from 1900. BTC's preferred route ran too close to the railway, so Badger proposed a variation "along Norwood Street instead of Dean or one of the other streets". Notably, Badger's Bellevue had frontage to Norwood Street. The tramline was ultimately run along Milton Road to the Toowong Cemetery, opening in July 1904, and up Dean Street to a terminus at the intersection of Woodstock Road and Miskin Street, opening over a month later.

Badger and BTC promoted the tramways heavily in the early 20th century. Their innovations included "picnic trams" (a concept which seem to have originated in London, but was promoted in Scotland as a Brisbane initiative) which could be hired for special events; tram day trip suggestions for tourists; and tram rides around the suburbs for visiting dignitaries. BTC also offered to supply electricity to areas along tramway lines, installing a demonstration electric light on a 75-foot (23 m) tower on Miskin Street.

Amidst BTC's growth, Badger moved into boarding accommodation in the city while his wife and sons lived in America for the boys' education. In 1905 BTC employees acquired an 1870s villa, Collina, and its nearly 2-acre (8,100 m^{2}) elevated site, fronting Woodstock Road and adjacent to the Toowong tram terminus. Badger and his housekeeper resided in Collina from around June 1905. In 1906, with Carrie Badger and their youngest son due to return to Brisbane, construction began on a new house to replace Collina. The designer of the house is not known.

The house has a number of unusual features which reflected its ownership by BTC and occupation by Badger. Unconventionally, its subfloor structure (posts and beams) was tram rails. The rails, stamped "DICK KERR & CO PHOENIX 1884", were from the first order for MTC's horse-drawn tram system and had been removed as part of BTC's electrification upgrade. Badger had personal and professional interests in electrical innovations, serving as member and president of the Queensland Electrical Association and inventing electrical devices to use in the tramways. Features of the house which were likely installed for Badger include an early electric light system and fittings and a hot-water system with parts manufactured by Brisbane foundry Smith Faulkner and Co (which manufactured the hot water system operated under this name between 1887 and 1916). These would have been uncommon elements in a Queensland home in 1906.

BTC's Superintendent of Buildings, William McLean, called for tenders for excavating and levelling a site in Toowong, likely for the Badgers' residence, in April 1906. In May 1906 Badger approached the Toowong Town Council and offered to plant ornamental trees on Woodstock Road. By mid-July, advertisements for the sale of a house were referring to "Mr Badger's new residence" as a nearby landmark. A tennis court was built in the grounds some time before 1909, and a motor garage was added before 1913; Badger, a motoring enthusiast, was an early member and later president of the Royal Automobile Club of Queensland.

Carrie Badger returned to Australia in September 1906, taking up residence in the newly-named Arlington. She undertook charity work, taught Sunday school, and hosted socials at Arlington, including tennis events and an afternoon tea in Arlington's "pretty gardens" for the Russian consul and his wife. Struck down by sudden illness in 1909, she died in July, and was buried in the Toowong cemetery.

Already somewhat controversial, Badger became a polarising figure after his wife's death. Well-educated, energetic and credited with the tramway system's success, he was a symbol of cosmopolitan progress and was a member of one of Brisbane's elite social circles. He determined where tramlines would be constructed, influencing the development of Brisbane's suburbs. However, he was also renowned for his authoritarianism. Answerable only to shareholders, he held unquestioned power over BTC and its employees. While Badger paid for employees' medical care where necessary, BTC workers were amongst the lowest paid in Australia. Attempts to form a union were resisted with threats of unemployment, and Badger forbade uniformed employees from wearing Australian Tramways Employees Union badges.

Tensions between Badger and BTC employees climaxed in 1912. On 18 January 1912, 480 of 550 BTC employees donned union badges in a coordinated show of strength, and were suspended or dismissed from duty. Approximately 10,000 people protested the "lockout" that evening. Representatives of 43 unions unanimously agreed to hold a general strike, declared 30 January 1912. The pro-union Strike Bulletin reported this as the "first simultaneous strike in the world". Earlier simultaneous strikes had been held overseas, but the 1912 Brisbane general strike appears to be the first in Australia, involving around 20,000 unionists. Businesses closed and tram services ceased. 3,000 special constables were sworn in to help control the unrest. Marches intensified into riots, with conflict between protestors, non-strikers, and police. Guards were posted at Arlington, accompanying Badger to and from work, and Badger reportedly threatened to shoot anyone who came onto the property after dark. Badger eventually dismissed the guards and relocated to temporary accommodation in the city. The height of the strike came on 2 February 1912, later known as Baton or Black Friday, when armed police charged a crowd of protestors. Reports described the violent scene as "unprecedented in the history of Brisbane". The strike ended after six weeks. The Commonwealth Court of Arbitration later ruled Badger had no authority to prevent workers from wearing badges.

Badger was granted a long leave of absence after the 1912 strike, and travelled to America. Badger did remain in Brisbane long enough to ferry voters to the Toowong election polls in his own motor car in April 1912. Arlington was transferred to Christina Gore, of Yandilla station, in July 1912. The house was renamed Endrim after the Gore family's properties in Ireland and Parramatta. In 1916 the house was transferred to Phyllis Trude, nee Gore, wife of tea company manager (and later Spanish consul) John Elworthy Trude.

Badger returned to Brisbane with his new wife, Australian-born Marion Starling. They lived in temporary accommodation at the West End tram terminus, but soon moved to Northam, a rental property at the Paddington tram terminus (no longer extant). Badger negotiated an extension of BTC's ownership of the Brisbane tramway system, due to end in 1917. Authority for the tramway system was handed to the 12 affected local authorities as the Brisbane Tramways Trust (BTT) on 1 January 1923, ending the last privately-run tramway system in an Australian capital. Badger retired and returned to America.

In 1924, the Toowong Progress Association petitioned BTT for a shelter shed at the Toowong terminus. BTC had not provided sheds as standard at stops or termini, but some were approved at the request of local authorities or associations. BTC had declined to build a shed at the Toowong terminus in 1915. BTT, however, engaged contractors Brown and Broad to build six sheds in Brisbane and New Farm in 1923. BTT agreed to construct Toowong's terminus shed in March 1924, to the same design as the 1923 sheds. This standard design was later called the P.1008 Standard Waiting Shelter Shed in Brisbane City Council (BCC) plans. The Toowong shed was finished by July 1924.

Control of the tramway system passed to BCC in 1925, which implemented upgrades and extensions. In 1933–34 BCC's distinctive technique of mass concrete tram tracks was first used extensively in Queen Street. Steel ties were used instead of sleepers, with the whole track set flush in a solid concrete "pavement". These concrete tracks required less maintenance and formed an excellent road surface for other vehicles.

Endrim remained well-known as Badger's residence. By 1922 rumours had begun that Badger had extended the terminus to Woodstock Road for his own benefit. In 1924 the house was described as an "ideal home, built by Mr JS Badger many years back" in an article which referenced its shingled roof and "rusticated" walls and noted that its high stone wall and ornamental iron entrance gates provided a "pleasing contrast to more modern homes". In 1954 a letter to the editor of The Courier Mail mentioned "Mr Badger's old home in Toowong" as one of the most notable remaining shingle roofs in Brisbane, though the roof was replaced shortly afterwards. Newspaper articles in the 1920s and 1930s also praised the gardens, highlighting the silky oak and jacaranda plantings. Trude was an enthusiastic gardener, and used flowers from the property as decoration in numerous socials, teas and wedding parties held at the house between the 1930s and 1950s. Her "lovely garden", featuring flowering annuals against green lawns, was one of a number included in The Sunday Mail's gardening column in 1936.

Trude sold parcels of her land between the 1930s and 1970s. The first, in 1934, was on the corner of Woodstock and Sherwood Roads, which included one set of the house's gates. Alterations to the house included the demolition of its branching front stair and construction of a garage (approved in 1956) and swimming pool (1968). The house featured in a 1964 Woman's Weekly article when it hosted a family wedding reception.

Tram services on the Toowong line continued until 1962, serving residents and tourists visiting Mount Coot-tha. The impact of the 1962 Paddington tram depot fire, increasing private car ownership, urban sprawl stretching into areas unconnected to the tram system, and lack of investment in technological developments saw trams replaced with buses throughout Brisbane. The Toowong line was one of the first to be replaced with diesel buses, before the entire system was discontinued in 1969.

Endrim's land was subdivided further and sold in the 1970s. Minor alterations occurred to the house. The service wing verandahs were enclosed and in c. 2000 the east bedroom of the first floor was altered to include an ensuite in the roof space (involving a skillion roofed dormer on the northern side) and a new balcony was added to its eastern side. As at 2017 Endrim remains in private ownership.

== Description ==
=== Endrim ===
Endrim is a substantial timber-framed and -clad house standing on the highest part of its 3678m2 grounds. The house faces north to Woodstock Road and its large front yard falls steeply to the north, terraced to form gently sloped lawns, separated by steeper earth berms. From its position, the house is afforded attractive views to the surrounding suburbs and the distant CBD, access to prevailing summer breezes from the northeast, and favourable solar orientation. The grounds are heavily planted on its boundaries, providing a sense of lush privacy, featuring impressive camphor laurels (Cinnamomum camphora) and poincianas (Delonix regia).

Entry from Woodstock Road is via a gateway into a narrow stair well comprising stone-lined walls and concrete treads, leading up to the lower front garden level and then to another narrow concrete stair toward the front of the house. The gateway comprises tall stone pillars topped by concrete spheres and a decorative wrought iron pedestrian gate. Two sets of matching vehicular gates provide entry from Sherwood Road: one set stands on land originally part of the Endrim land parcel but is now part of another residential allotment - 6 Woodstock Road (Lot 4 on RP50607).

The house is high-set and has a rectangular core clad with chamferboards, sheltered by a wide wrap-around verandah on its front (north) and (east and west) sides. It has a large, complex, hipped roof clad with corrugated metal. The roof is continuous over the verandah, with wide eaves battened to provide ventilation of the roof space. Large weatherboard-clad hipped roof dormers projecting on the four sides of the roof house the rooms of the first floor. The western and southern dormers have tall timber-framed casements. Those of the eastern dormer have been replaced with a large set of French doors onto a balcony (c. 2000). The northern dormer has large timber-framed double-hung sash windows flanking a central door onto a narrow unroofed balcony nested within the roof above the former front entrance. Projecting from the roof beside this narrow balcony is a recent skillion-roofed dormer (c. 2000), accommodating an ensuite bathroom.

The centre of the front verandah has a wide projecting bay (the former entrance). An angled verandah piazza on the northeast corner and a rectangular broad verandah at the western end provide generous spaces. The verandah has square timber posts with moulded collars and capitals: either side of the original front entrance the posts are paired. The verandah valance is clad with weatherboards on the exterior and lined with v-jointed (VJ) boards on the interior. The verandah ceiling is flat, lined with VJs, and has a moulded timber cornice and cover strips.

A semi-detached service wing stands on the western side of the house, connected via the western verandah of the main house to form a breezeway. A timber lattice screen and door shields the breezeway from Sherwood Road. The service wing has a Dutch gable roof, clad with corrugated metal sheets and has generous battened eaves. A verandah wraps its southern and western sides and has been enclosed.

There are two tall facebrick chimneys with simple corbelled detailing: one rises from the main house and one from the service wing.

The perimeter of the understorey is screened by a skirt of alternating diagonal panels of timber battens. Arched openings provide access under the house. The excavated understorey is retained by a stone wall to form a flat dirt floor. The subfloor structure comprises steel tram rail posts and facebrick pillars. The posts and pillars support a grid of tram rail beams that are paired where under the outer walls of the house and neatly housed into the chimney. The rails are stamped "DICK KERR & CO PHOENIX 1884" and have evidence of wear consistent with their former use as tram tracks. From the subfloor beams upwards, the structure appears to be conventionally timber framed.

A small room of unknown use, accessed by double doors, stands independently under the house comprising part-height brick walls. Nearby is an early metal hot water system comprising a water tank and heater with a metal flue feeding into adjacent chimney breast. The tank is stamped Smith Faulkner and Co. It is unclear if the system is proprietary or custom made or if it is/was also connected to electricity. A wine cellar has been formed in the understorey with a stair up into the ground floor of the house.

The impressive main entrance is located centrally on the north elevation, within the octagonal bay. It comprises a wide, glazed and panelled door with side and fan lights framed by moulded architraves and a simple "entablature" that recurs as a motif above doors and windows throughout the house. An early electric doorbell is missing its button.

The interior layout is intact with VJ lined partitions and ceilings, moulded timber skirting boards, cornice, architraves, and dado rails. A transverse hall divides the ground floor of the house in half from east to west, separating the principal rooms (on the northern side of the house) from the secondary rooms (on the southern side). The principal rooms (entrance hall, dining room, and drawing room) are separated by wide sliding pocket doors and when opened, the three rooms form a large space the entire width of the house. The rooms include decorative ceilings and finely crafted timber joinery with that of the dining room retaining its clear finish, revealing the high quality of its craftsmanship and material. The ceilings of the ground floor are 3.8m (approximately 12 feet) high.

The house retains large double-hung sash windows and timber-framed glazed French doors with fanlights. The dining room has a handsome fireplace with a clear-finished timber surround that includes glazed tiles, shelves, and mirror.

The house retains a variety of early light fixtures and an early ceramic corner sink with cast iron apron and a pressed metal splashback.

A stair in the entrance hall and another, similar but less detailed secondary stair in the transverse hall provide access to the first floor, which accommodates bedrooms and a bathroom. The walls and ceiling are lined with VJs and have moulded timber skirtings, architraves, and cornices.

The breezeway separating the main house from the service wing includes a "laundry stair" down to the yard. This is a very narrow and steep timber stair with battened sides and a battened door at its base with an early rim lock. This recess has been enclosed and a floor inserted over the top of the stair to seal it off and it is no longer useable.

The interior of the service wing core has been altered and is now one large space. The walls and ceiling have been relined, however, it retains a double-sided chimney breast with a wide kitchen fireplace and wash tub hob. Part of the now enclosed verandah that wraps the service wing has been incorporated into the room by demolishing part of the verandah wall.

An early door and catwalk over the laundry stair from the kitchen leads into the western broad verandah. An early door provides access onto the front verandah.

The floor boards of the ground floor are recent, have been laid over the original boards.

=== Woodstock Road Tram Shed ===
A tram shed stands in the unmade road reserve of Miskin Street, at the intersection with Woodstock Road. Miskin Street is steeply sloped and the shed stands on a flat concrete slab cut into the slope.

The shed is an open-sided, rectangular, freestanding pavilion with an unlined hipped roof supported by robust corner posts with curved bracing brackets. The roof is clad with corrugated metal sheets and has eaves that overhang the posts on all sides.

At the rear of the shelter is a timber-framed infill panel between the upper part of the posts lined with flat sheet material and timber cover battens.

Two seats to a standard design stand under the roof, both facing the street. They comprise a timber plank back rail and seat on a timber frame. The posts of the shelter and the seats stand on modern steel stirrups which are mounted into the concrete slab.

=== Woodstock Road Tram Track ===
A tram track is embedded under the bitumen road surface within the Woodstock Road reserve. It is located south of the centre line of the road, within approximately 10m of the front of the tram shed. The track comprises steel rails approximately 1.4m (approximately 4feet 8.5inches) apart embedded in an even, exposed aggregate concrete pavement. Also embedded is a standard stormwater tram rail drain, which is a steel grate that spans between the rails and drains the grooves in the rails. The physical termination of the track is approximately aligned with the eastern edge of Miskin Street.

== Heritage listing ==
Endrim and the Woodstock Road tram shed and tram track was listed on the Queensland Heritage Register on 23 March 2018 having satisfied the following criteria.

The place is important in demonstrating the evolution or pattern of Queensland's history.

Endrim (originally known as Arlington) and the Woodstock Road tram shed and tram track are important in demonstrating the evolution of Brisbane's former public tramway system, a vital mode of public transport between 1885 and 1969; the expansion of which determined patterns of settlement in Brisbane.

Endrim, built in 1906 by the Brisbane Tramways Company for its general manager, Joseph Stillman Badger, responsible for electrifying and upgrading the tramway system, is the only known company-provided housing for Queensland tramway employees. Former 1884 horse-drawn tram rails, used as integral structural members supporting the house, further illustrate the close association of the house with the tramway.

The Woodstock Road Tram Shed (built 1924 by the Brisbane Tramways Trust as a standard passenger waiting shelter) is an early, representative example of the standard sheds constructed in Brisbane. The concealed Woodstock Road track is the terminus of the Toowong line and demonstrates the expansion of the tram service.

The place is important in demonstrating the principal characteristics of a particular class of cultural places.

Endrim is a fine, intact example of an elite early 20th century Queensland house and retains the principal characteristics of this type:

The tram shed is an intact example of a tram passenger waiting shelter built in Brisbane during its tram era. It retains the principal characteristics of these structures, including: standing adjacent to a tram track; freestanding open-sided pavilion form with generous sheltering roof; being built to a standard design, and; incorporating standard waiting seats.

The place is important because of its aesthetic significance.

Standing on a high ridge within a leafy suburban landscape, the house with its encircling verandah, picturesque multi-angled roof, decorative interiors, and garden with mature trees and stone and iron gates, is intact and has a Federation-era aesthetic. Notable for its craftsmanship including particularly timber joinery, it features living spaces evoking a sense of suburban domesticity. Striking views to the immediate suburban landscape and distant CBD are provided from its verandah and rooms and picturesque views to the house from its front and eastern garden.

The place has a special association with the life or work of a particular person, group or organisation of importance in Queensland's history.

Endrim was built for, and has a special association with, American Joseph Stillman Badger (1851–1934), general manager of the Brisbane Tramways Company from 1897 to 1914 and then managing director to 1922. Badger was instrumental in the early electrification and expansion of the Brisbane tram network, an important advancement of this prominent and integral public transport system. During this period he was the catalyst of the Brisbane General Strike of early 1912, the first simultaneous strike in Australia, and an event of particular significance in Badger's life and his association with the Brisbane Tramways Company.

== See also ==
- Richard McLean Badger, son of Joseph Stillman Badger
