= Brisbane Tramway Museum =

Australian transport museum

Coordinates: 27°24′26.37″S 152°56′16.40″E

The Brisbane Tramway Museum is an Australian transport museum that has preserved a collection of trams and trolleybuses most of which operated in Brisbane from 1897 until 1969. The museum is located in Ferny Grove.

== History ==
The Brisbane Tramway Museum Society was established in 1968, when it became apparent that the Brisbane City Council was preparing to close Brisbane's tram system. In 1972, a site at Ferny Grove was made available and the museum opened in June 1980.

== Collection ==
As of 10 November 2005, the museum has a collection of 25 trams, 24 of which formerly operated on the Brisbane tram network. The 25th tram in the museum's collection ran in Sydney. The museum also has two single-deck Brisbane trolley-buses built on MF2B chassis by Sunbeam of Wolverhampton, England; fleet numbers 1 (of 1951, with a body by Charles Hope of Brisbane) and 34 (of 1960, body by Athol Hedges). These are on static display.

A number of trams in the museum's collection are operated on a short length of demonstration track 250 metres in length. The oldest operational tram in the museum's collection is No. 47, a "California Combination" or "Matchbox" tram, built in 1901. The newest tram in the collection is No. 554 a "Four Motor" tram built by the Brisbane City Council after the Paddington tram depot fire, which entered service in 1964. Other operational trams include a 10 bench "Toastrack" tram No. 65, a small centre-aisle or "Baby Dreadnought" tram No. 99, No. 341, a "Dropcentre" tram and another "Four Motor" tram No. 429. A selection of these trams operate each Sunday afternoon with operations curtailed in the event of wet weather.

The museum's collection of support vehicles are all former Brisbane City Council Tramways Department vehicles, including a tower wagon used for repairing overhead wires, and a Scammell breakdown recovery truck which was formerly used as an artillery towing truck in World War II.

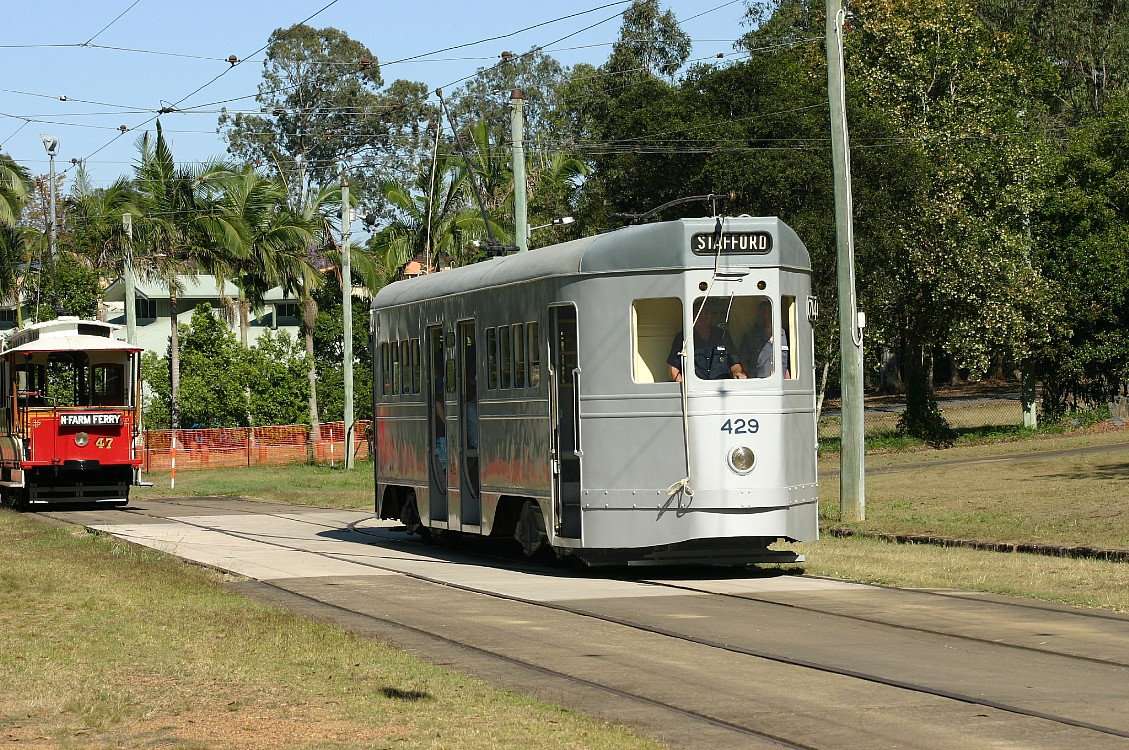
Four Motor tram 429, in 1960s livery, in operation at the museum

The museum houses an extensive photographic collection of Brisbane's tramway and street transport heritage, together with tickets and uniforms worn by staff of the tramway operators, a feature of which were the unusual "Foreign legion" caps (more correctly called kepis) worn by drivers and conductors until 1961 and inspectors until more recently.

The museum is notable for other elements of the former Brisbane system in its collection. The museum's depots are composed of bays from the former Ipswich Road tram depot. The museum's direct current substation has been built from equipment retrieved from former Brisbane tramway substations. An elevated signal cabin which stood at the corner of Brunswick and Wickham streets, Fortitude Valley has also been preserved.

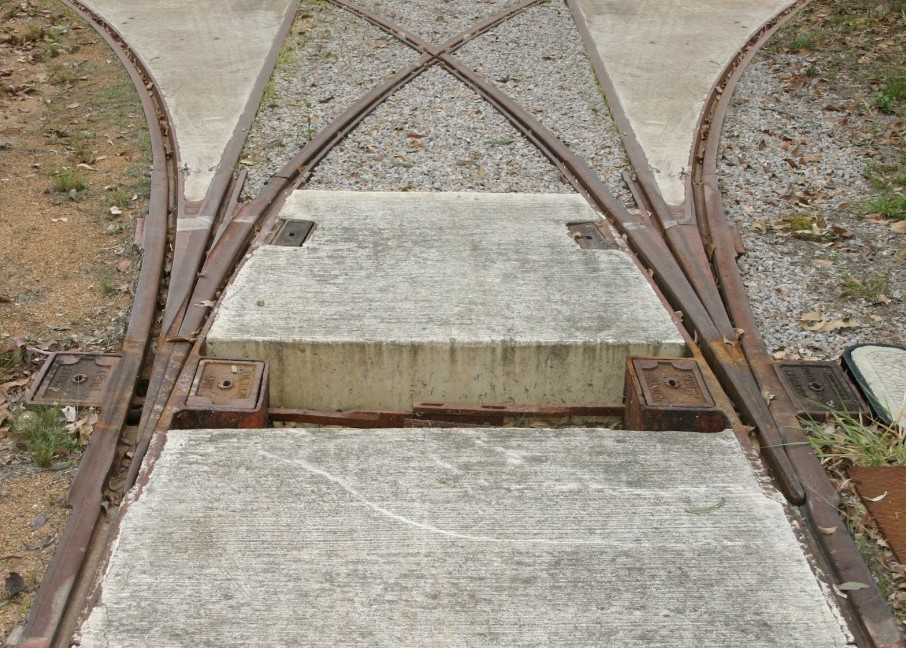
The museum's three-way points

The museum's very short section of track has been recovered from Ipswich Road depot, Gregory Terrace and Ipswich Road between Moorooka and Salisbury. In keeping with the practice of the Brisbane City Council Tramways Department, the museum has constructed its track in mass concrete rather than on sleepers and ballast. The museum houses a unique three-way set of points, originally located at Light Street depot. These points can be found outside the museum's main depot shed.

== See also ==
- List of transport museums
- Brisbane Transport
- Paddington tram depot fire
- Trams in Brisbane
- Bus transport in Queensland
