= Trolleybuses in Brisbane =

Australian defunct busing system

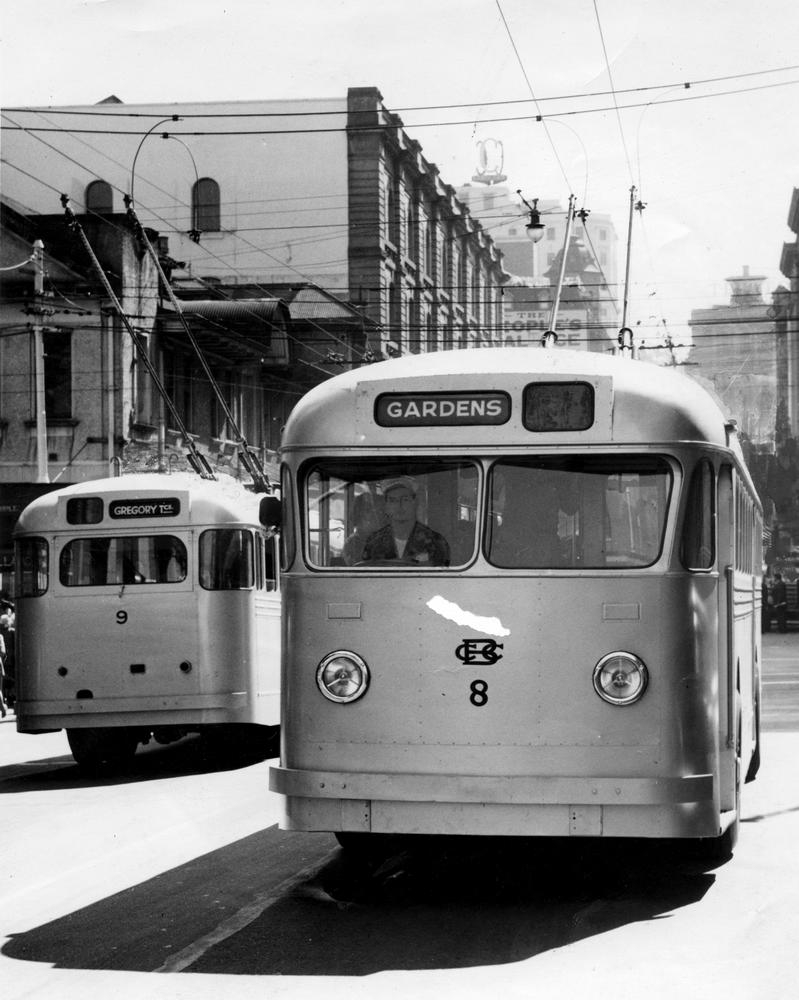
- New Brisbane trolleybuses, 1951.

Operation
- Locale: Brisbane, Queensland, Australia
- Open: 12 August 1951
- Close: 13 March 1969
- Status: Closed
- Operator: Brisbane City Council

Infrastructure
- Depot: Milton

Statistics
- Track length (total): 28 kilometres

The Brisbane trolleybus system was part of the public transport network in Brisbane, Quensland, Australia from 1951 until 1969. The Brisbane City Council operated 36 Sunbeam trolleybuses on a 28 kilometre network.

== History ==
The Brisbane Tramways Trust experimented with providing bus services in the 1920s but these proved impractical due to mechanical unreliability and Brisbane's poor road surface quality. The first permanent bus services were introduced in 1940 as a supplement to Brisbane's tram services.

In 1948, the Brisbane City Council municipalized 20 privately run bus operators and expanded its own fleet of buses. The first tram lines to close were the Lower Edward Street to Gardens route, and the Upper Edward Street to Gregory Terrace route in 1947, the latter due to the very steep grades on that line. The vertical curves were difficult for Brisbane's double bogie cars. Diesel-engined buses initially replaced tram services on these lines. These were however replaced by trolleybuses on 12 August 1951.

The council also intended to introduce a trolleybus service to the new University of Queensland campus at St Lucia, and purchased enough trolleybus chassis from the United Kingdom for the route. However, it was vigorously opposed by residents and the plan was abandoned. The council then found itself with surplus trolleybuses but no route on which to run them, so it decided to run the trolleybuses from Herston to Stanley Bridge, East Brisbane, commencing in 1952.

Several other trolleybus routes were subsequently established in the eastern suburbs. The first of these replaced a tram route, along Cavendish Road, in 1955. Other trolleybus routes to Seven Hills and Carina did not involve tram route closures.

The network reached its peak of 28 kilometres on 19 June 1960 when the Carina route was extended. Most of the network closed in 1968 with the last service operating on 13 March 1969.

== Fleet ==
The fleet comprised 36 Sunbeam MF2B trolleybuses; 30 bodied locally by Charles Hope in 1951/52 and six by Athol Hedges in 1959. Two have been preserved by the Brisbane Tramway Museum.

== Depot ==
The depot and workshops for the trolleybuses was located in Milton on Milton Road between Hale and Castlemaine Streets. The former depot was demolished to make way for a redevelopment of Lang Park.

== See also ==
- Brisbane Tramway Museum
- History of Brisbane
- Trams in Brisbane
- Transport in Brisbane
