= Trams in Brisbane =

Tramway network in Brisbane, Australia

Brisbane tramway network
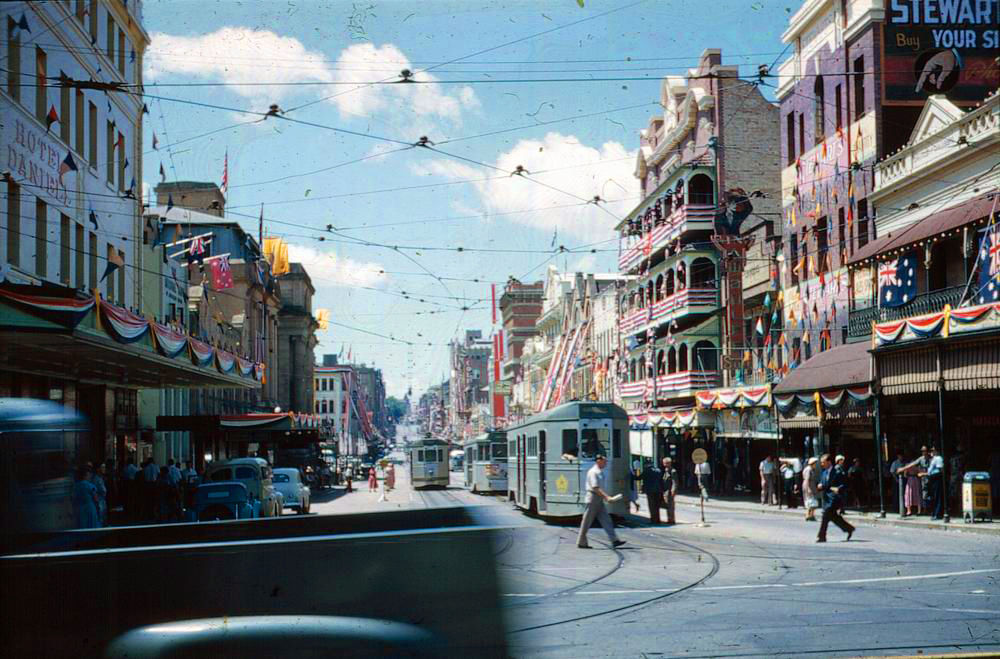
- Trams and buildings in Adelaide Street decorated for the visit of Queen Elizabeth II in 1954

Operation
- Locale: Brisbane, Australia

Infrastructure
- Track gauge: 1,435 mm (4 ft 8 1/2 in) standard gauge

Statistics
Horsecar era: 1885–1899
- Status: Closed
- Operators: Metropolitan Tramway and Investment Company
- Propulsion system: Horses
Electric era: 1897–1969
- Status: Closed
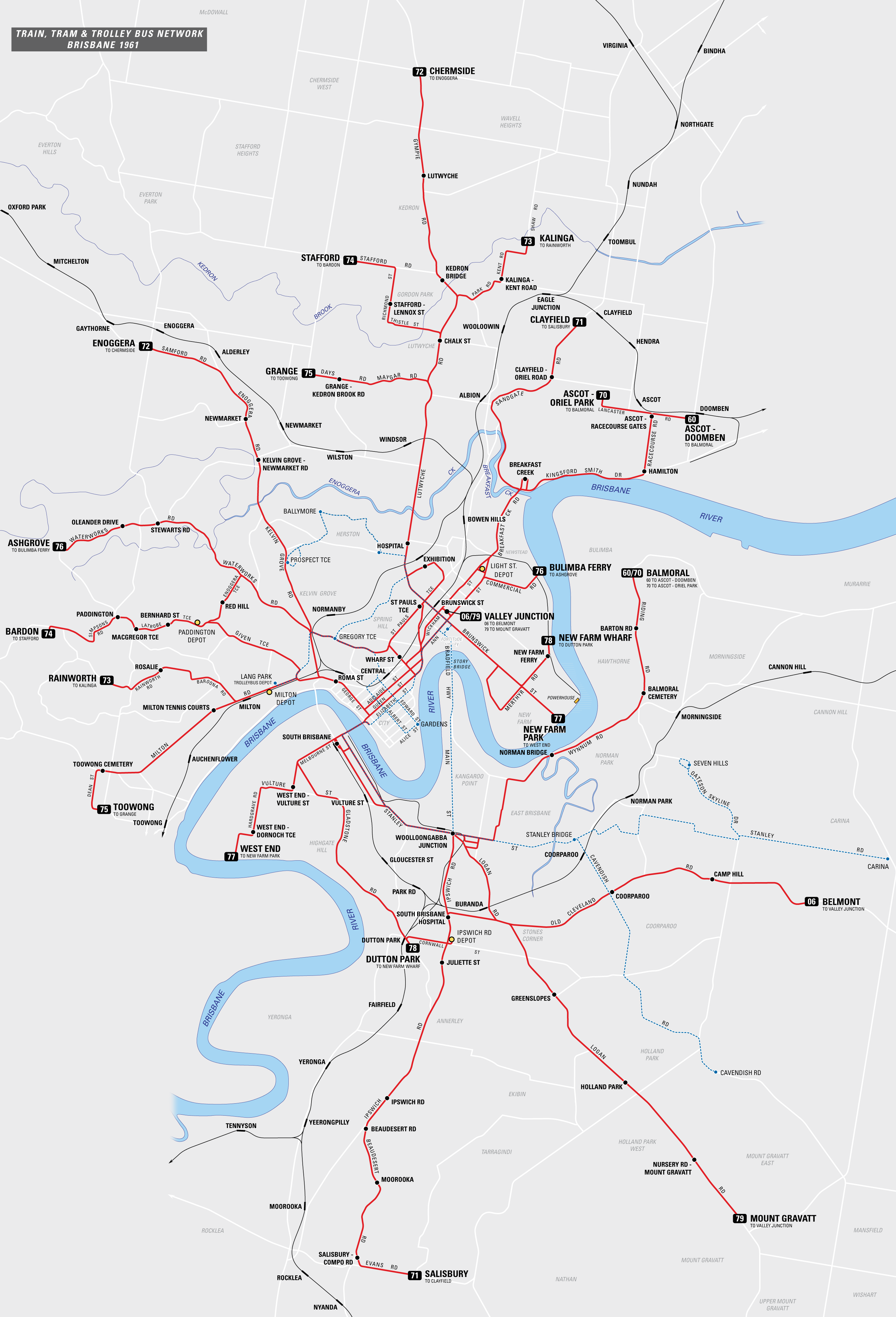
- Routes: Network in 1961 Tram routes Trolleybus routes Rail Main roads
- Operators: Brisbane Tramways Co Ltd (1896–1922); Brisbane Tramways Trust (1922–1925); Brisbane City Council (1925–1969)
- Propulsion system: Electric
- Electrification: 500 V DC catenary (later 600 V DC catenary)
- Route length: 109 km (68 mi) (max, 1954)

The Brisbane tramway network served the city of Brisbane, Australia, between 1885 and 1969. It ran on standard gauge track. The electric system was originally energised to 500 volts, and subsequently increased to 600 volts. All tramcars built in Brisbane up to 1938 had an open design. This proved so popular, especially on hot summer nights, that the trams were used as fundraisers and often chartered right up until the last service by social groups.

Most trams operated with a two-person crew including a driver (or motorman) and a conductor, who moved about the tram collecting fares and issuing tickets. The exceptions to this arrangement were on the Gardens line (Lower Edward Street) where the short duration of the trip meant it was more effective for passengers to simply drop their fare into a fare box as they entered the tram; and the "one man cars" which operated in the early 1930s (see below).

The peak year for patronage was 1944–45 when almost 160 million passengers were carried. The system route length reached its maximum extent of 109 kilometres (68 mi) in 1952. The total track length was 199 kilometres (124 mi), owing to many routes ending in single, rather than double, track. Single track segments of the track were protected by signalling which operated off the trolley wire. By 1959 more than 140 kilometres (87 mi) of track were laid in concrete, a method of track construction pioneered in Brisbane.

The last track opened was in O'Keefe Street Woolloongabba, in May 1961. However, this track was not used in normal passenger service and was merely used to reduce dead running from Logan Road back to Ipswich Road Depot.

Of the Australian capital cities which closed their networks between the 1950s and 1970s (only Melbourne and Adelaide retained trams, although Adelaide only had one line in operation), Brisbane was the last capital city to close its tram network. Despite the decision to shut down the network, Brisbane's trams were held with great affection by locals, and one commentator described their removal as "one of the most appalling urban planning mistakes in the city’s history". There have been ongoing proposals since the early 1990s to reinstate a functional tram network.

== History ==
Brisbane expanded to become one of the most dispersed cities in the world by the 1870s. In the early years of Brisbane's settlement, walking was the most convenient way to get around as most people choose to live close to their workplace. In 1875, the railway line to Ipswich opened up some areas in western and southern districts, however fares were expensive, as was owning a horse.

By 1885 an omnibus service reached almost every part of Brisbane. Omnibuses consisted of a strongly constructed wooden wagon with seating for people on the roof and a back-door entrance to the interior.

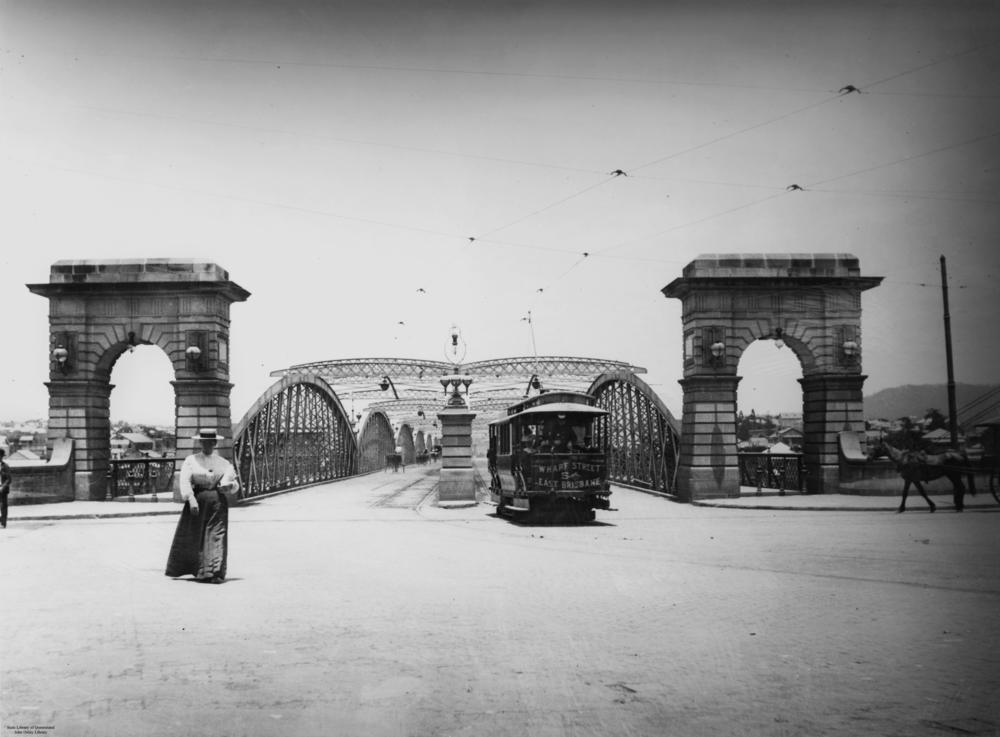
Early electric tram at the northern end of the second permanent Victoria Bridge c. 1906

=== Metropolitan Tramway and Investment Company (1885–1896) ===
On 10 August 1885 the Metropolitan Tramway and Investment Company began official horse-drawn tramway services for the public. The 18 tramcars were built from highly polished cedar and mahogany in the United States by JG Brill Company and John Stephenson Company. Fares were expensive, with the typical patron belonging to the middle class. Some even used the services to go home for lunch. In 1893, an economic crisis and significant floods reduced the system's patronage steeply.

=== Brisbane Tramways Company Limited (1896–1922) ===
The first electric tramway ran along Stanley Street, in South Brisbane on 16 June 1897. Horse-drawn carriages were still being used in 1899.

In 1900 local residents campaigned to have the Kelvin Grove tramway extended along Enoggera Road to the Newmarket Hotel in Newmarket. However, a new bridge over Enoggera Creek would be required. There were also concerns the close proximity of the proposed tramway would take revenue away from the railway line. However these concerns were resolved and the tramway extension to the Newmarket Hotel was opened on Monday 27 July 1903.

Up until the end of World War I, Brisbane's trams were the primary method used for travelling within the city.

=== Brisbane Tramways Trust (1922–1925) ===
Even during the Great Depression in the 1930s Brisbane's trams ran at a profit

Between 1923 and 1934 tram services in Brisbane were greatly expanded.

=== City of Brisbane (1925–1969) ===
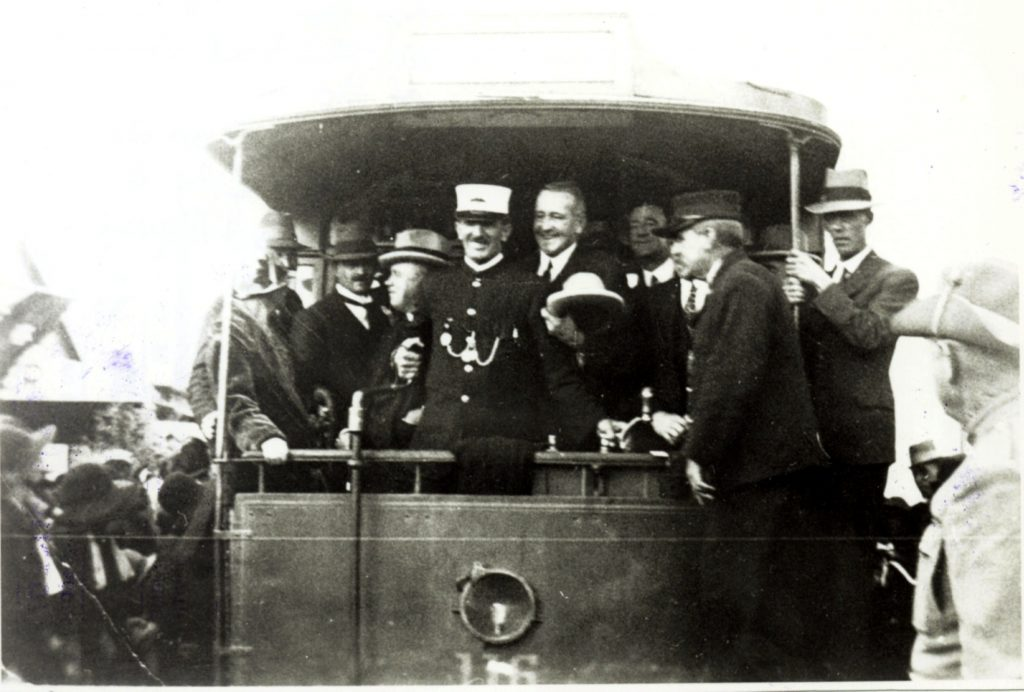
The first tram to Grange, July 1928

Brisbane's tramway system came under the control of the newly merged Brisbane City Council (BCC) in 1925.

After seven years of agitation, Brisbane's tram service was extended to Grange in July 1928. The opening ceremony was attended by the Lord Mayor of Brisbane, William Jolly, and two Members of the Queensland Legislative Assembly, James Stevingstone Kerr and Charles Taylor. The mayor had threatened to not attend any ceremony for the opening of the tram service because two rival groups were organising separate celebrations; he would only attend if there was a single ceremony.

Until 1934, the trams carried mail between the Brisbane General Post Office and suburban post office branches, and also acted as mobile postboxes.

Through the 1940s and 1950s the tram system received strong political support within the council, which continued to expand the tram network and upgrade its fleet with some of the most advanced trams in Australia. Trolleybuses were introduced in 1951. The last tramway to open was in March 1961. Clem Jones became Lord Mayor of Brisbane the same year, and all new route construction was cancelled.

==== Decline of the electric street transport systems ====
By 1948 Brisbane's trams failed to return a profit as they could not compete with the more efficient bus services. Urban development, often well away from public transport, the rise of suburban shopping centres and the relative decline in the cost of motorcars meant Brisbane's public street transport system increasingly had to compete with the private motor car. Patronage slowly declined from a post war peak of 148 million passenger journeys in 1946, to approximately 64 million passenger journeys in 1968.

Political support for the tram system waned in the 1960s, particularly so after the Paddington tram depot fire on 28 September 1962. 67 trams were destroyed, which represented 20% of the entire fleet. Brisbane's Lord Mayor Alderman Clem Jones was pro-freeway and private car. The Kalinga, Toowong, Rainworth and Bulimba ferry routes closed in December 1962.

==== The closure of the tram and trolleybus systems ====
In common with many other cities, Brisbane converted its remaining tram lines between 1968 and 1969 to all bus operation. The last trolley buses ran on 13 March 1969 and the final trams ran on 13 April 1969. Photographs of this last tram ride, organised by Grahame Garner and other tramways workers are in the University of Queensland Fryer Library collection. The tramway closure was notable for the speed with which it was carried out. Over 300 replacement Leyland Panther buses were purchased, at the time the largest single bus purchase in the world. Most older, wooden trams were stripped of metal parts and burnt at the City Council's yard at Cribb Street, Milton (adjacent to the tramway workshops). The bodies of later, all-metal cars were sold as sheds and playground equipment.

=== Brisbane Tramway Museum (1969–present) ===
The Brisbane Tramway Museum Society was formed in 1968 to preserve some of Brisbane's trams. As of 2016 the museum has 24 Brisbane trams in its collection, with 6 operational; California type tram 47, Ten Bench tram 65, Baby Dreadnought tram 99, Dropcentre tram 341, Four Motor tram 429, and the last tram built and officially operated in Brisbane, Four Motor Phoenix tram 554. Tramway operations commenced at the museum at Ferny Grove in 1980.

=== 1990s light rail proposals ===
There have been several proposals from both the Brisbane City Council and state government to return a tram or light rail system to Brisbane since the 1990s. The most prominent of these include the ambitious 1997 Brisbane Light Rail Transit proposal. The plans escalated to a Queensland government tender for four company consortia to purchase new trams, construct and operate the system. The project was estimated to cost A$235 million but was subsequently vetoed in favour of expanding the existing bus network.

These various proposed options included a line from Roma Street station to Queensland University of Technology’s CBD campus along George Street, CBD to West End and University of Queensland via Victoria Bridge and Melbourne Street and CBD to Fortitude Valley via Wickham Terrace.

=== 2007 Light Rail Plan ===
In 2007, following several failed road and tunnel projects, and based on the recommendations of the Brisbane City Council's 2006 CBD masterplan, Premier Peter Beattie announced $250 million of state government funding for an extensive light rail system that would rival Melbourne's trams network and be significantly larger than those in Sydney or Adelaide. The plan was to link South Brisbane to New Farm and Bowen Hills with future extensions down the newly created South Eastern and Inner Northern Busways, bridges and pedestrian spines. In the March 2008 Brisbane city elections, the Queensland Greens campaigned on a more comprehensive plan. However, by June 2008 progress had stalled, without an official project announcement, the Brisbane City Council once again distancing itself from the plan due to cost of the investment (estimated at AU$600 million for the New Farm link), instead giving consideration of diverting the funds to enhancing the bus and CityCat ferry systems.

== Types of trams ==
Brisbane never adopted an alphabetical or numerical system for classifying its trams, opting instead to use official descriptions, such as "standard centre aisle car", or "drop-centre saloon car".

=== Horse trams ===
- single deck saloon
- single deck cross bench
- double deck – open top deck, lower saloon

=== Electric trams ===
==== Converted electric trams ====
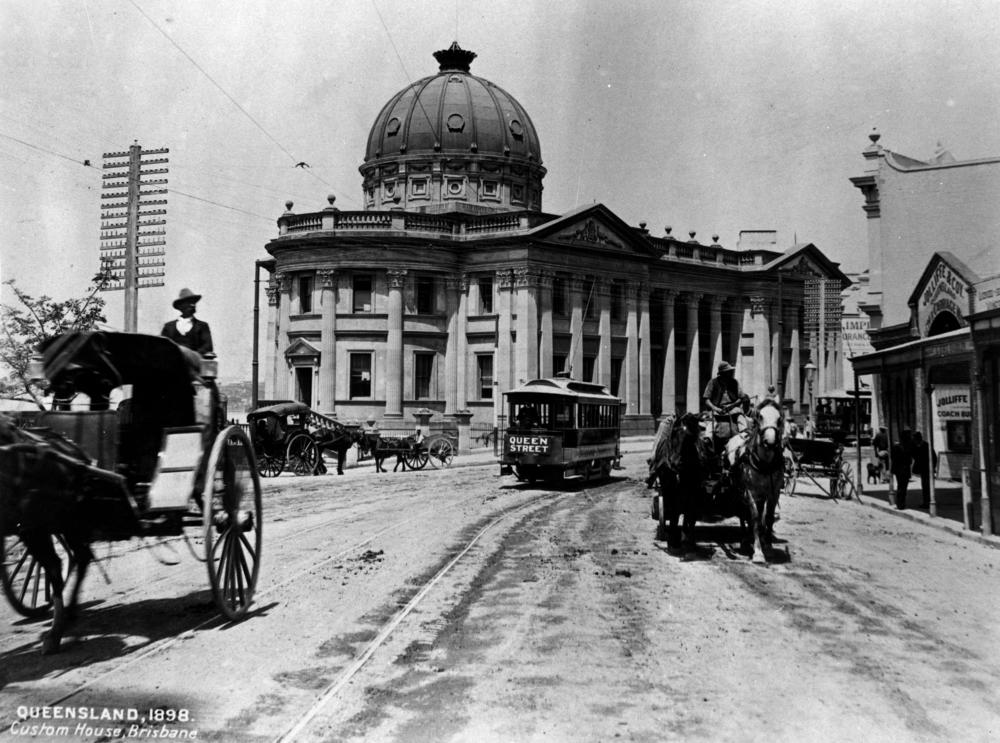
Saloon Car in Queen Street, 1898

Delivery of early combination cars was delayed, as a result the tramway company decided to convert many of the horse trams to electric operation, as a temporary expedient. Despite this, many of these converted cars remained in passenger service well into the 1930s.

===== California Combination car =====
The prototype Brisbane electric tram (No 1) was built at the Melbourne cable tram workshops from the body of a horse tram, and had 5 saloon windows instead of the usual 4 windows on the new-built Combination cars, with one fixed and one tip-over seat on each end platform.

===== Large Combination cars =====
These three trams were built in 1904 from three single deck horse trams, similar to the new-built California Combination trams but with 6 saloon windows as opposed to 4 on the new trams, and a single fixed cross-bench seat on each end platform instead of 2 tip-over seats each end. Withdrawn from service 1925 to 1930s.

====== Saloon cars ======
Each tram in this class was constructed by joining two single deck saloon horse trams together on a single motorised chassis. Their long, enclosed bodies gave rise to their nickname of "coffin cars". They were built in 1897, when delivery of new electric trams was delayed. 6 cars in this class. They were all withdrawn from service by 1930.

====== "Summer" cars ======
The 6 bench horse trams were motorised and later most were lengthened to accommodate 10 cross benches. One car was to remain in service until 1958 as an advertising car.

==== New-built electric trams ====
===== California Combination =====
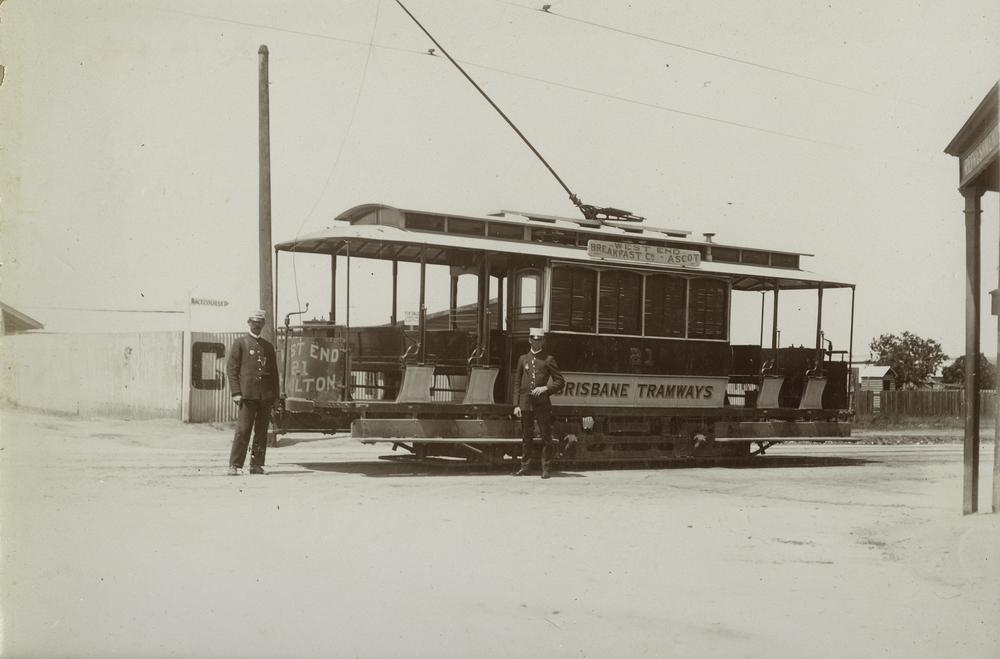
Combination tram in Racecourse Road, Ascot

Officially referred to as "Standard Combination" trams, but more popularly referred to as "matchboxes". They had a central 4 window saloon with 2 tip-over cross-bench seats on each end platform. There were 62 trams in this class, built between 1897 and 1904, with the last one withdrawn from passenger service in 1952. Two, (nos 14 and 15), were converted into "scrubber" cars (track maintenance cars). Several were used as advertising cars, with 47 and 53 being used as one man cars on the Gardens shuttle route (see below).

===== Nine Bench Cars =====
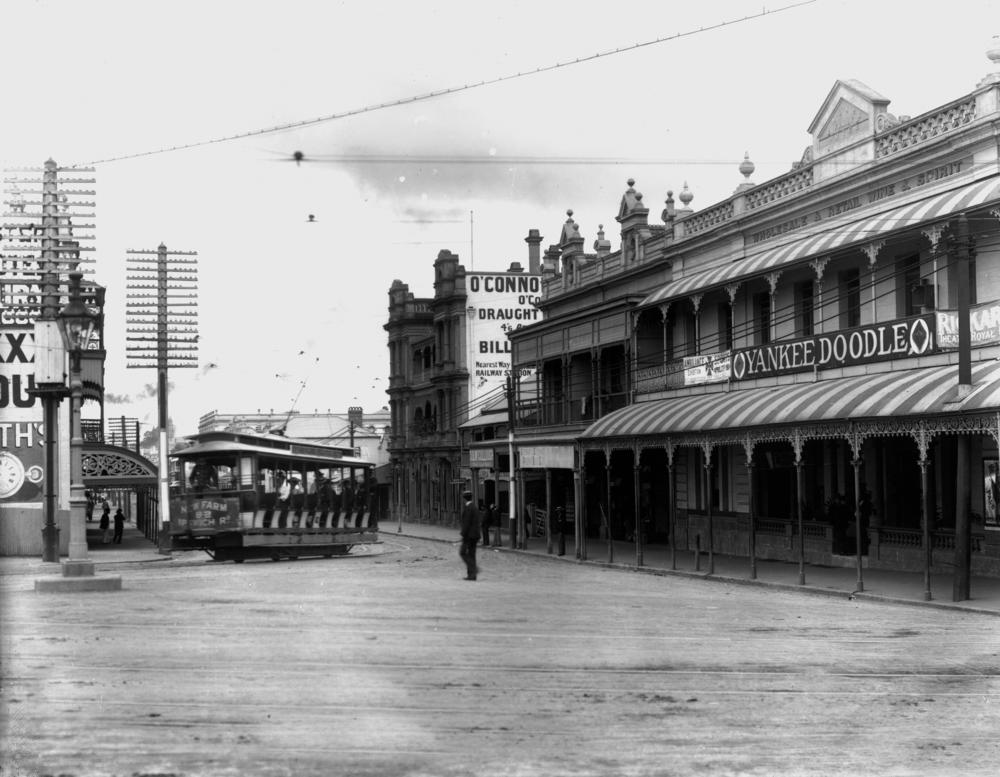
Nine-bench tram in Stanley Street, Woolloongabba

These 4 trams were constructed in 1897 and 1898 by the Brisbane Tramways Company. They were cross bench cars with no centre aisle. Two of the benches (those attached to the end bulkheads) were fixed and the other seven benches were tip-over. They could carry 45 seated passengers, plus standees. Two were withdrawn from service in 1938, the other two were probably withdrawn in 1943.

===== Brills =====
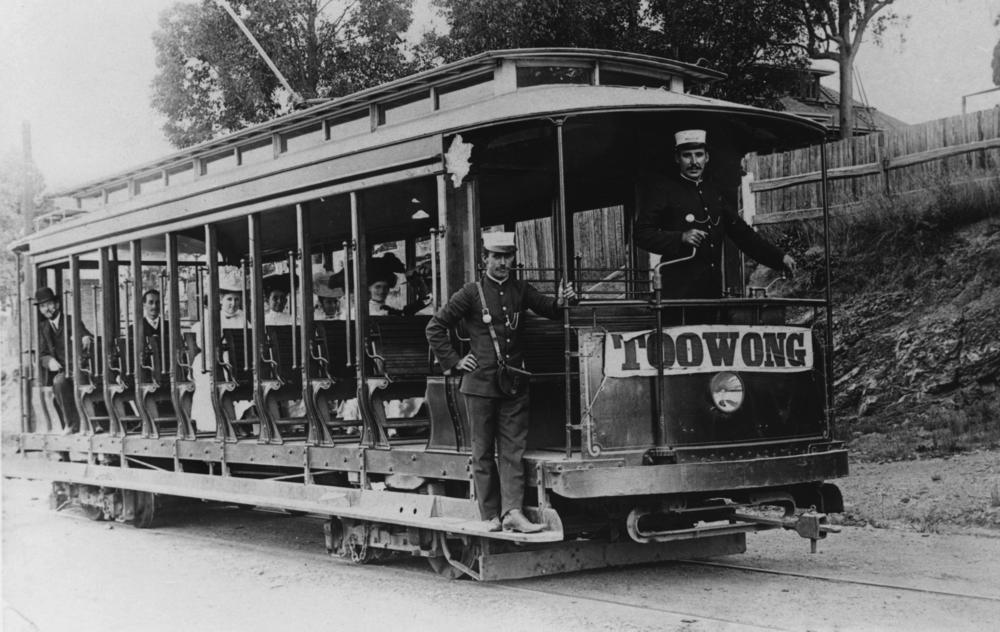
Brill at the Toowong terminus – note the trailer coupling at the front of the tram

These 20 cars were officially "bogie open tip-over cross-bench cars". They were a standard design tram built by JG Brill Company of Philadelphia, although two were built by the Brisbane Tramways Company, presumably under licence from the Brill Company. They each had 4 fixed back-to-back benches and 8 tip-over benches. The first 8 had clerestory roofs, the remainder had plain roofs. The first 8 were also fitted with couplings for trailers, but the trailers were eventually motorised (see "light twelve bench cars" below.) As these trams only had hand brakes, operating a coupled set was physically demanding on drivers. In later years these workhorses were very dilapidated and had diagonal cross bracing on each bulkhead to reduce body sway. One tram was involved in a bad accident in 1944 and was converted to centre aisle design (see Special Dreadnoughts). They were gradually withdrawn from service between 1937 and 1952.

===== Light Twelve Bench Cars =====
These eight cars were originally built as trailers between 1901 and 1903, but were motorised in 1912. They had 12 fixed back-to-back benches and could carry 66 passengers. They were all withdrawn from service between 1948 and 1951.

===== Standard Ten Bench Cars =====
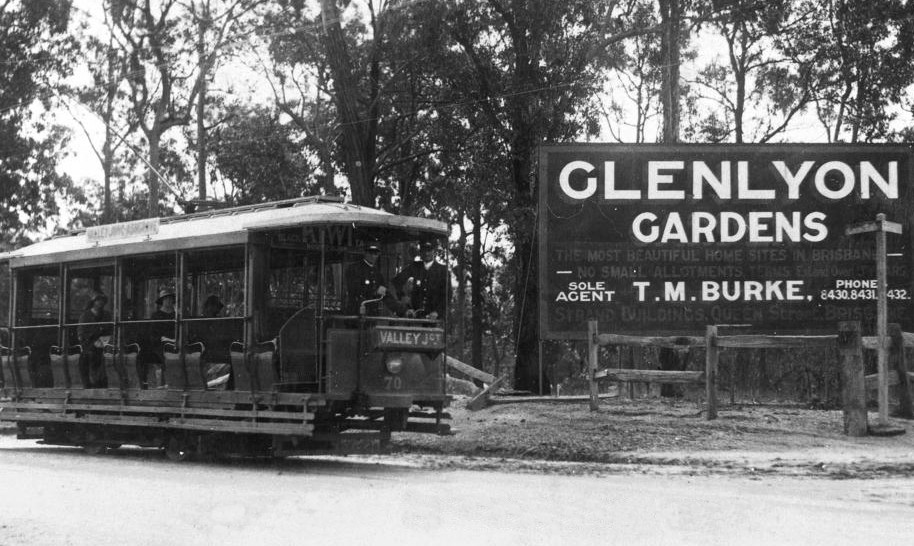
Ten-bench tram in Waterworks Road Ashgrove

There were 32 of these sturdy little single truck trams constructed in Brisbane. 28 were built by the Brisbane Tramways Company between 1907 and 1921 and a further 4 were built by the Brisbane Tramways Trust between 1923 and 1925. They had fixed, back-to-back bench seating carrying 50 seated passengers (plus standees). They were commonly called "toastracks" or "jumping jacks". In 1936 4 of these cars were converted to Baby Dreadnoughts (see below); another two were converted to this class in 1944. Apart from one car converted to an advertising car and another retained for historical purposes, they were all withdrawn from service between 1952 and 1955.

===== Dreadnoughts =====
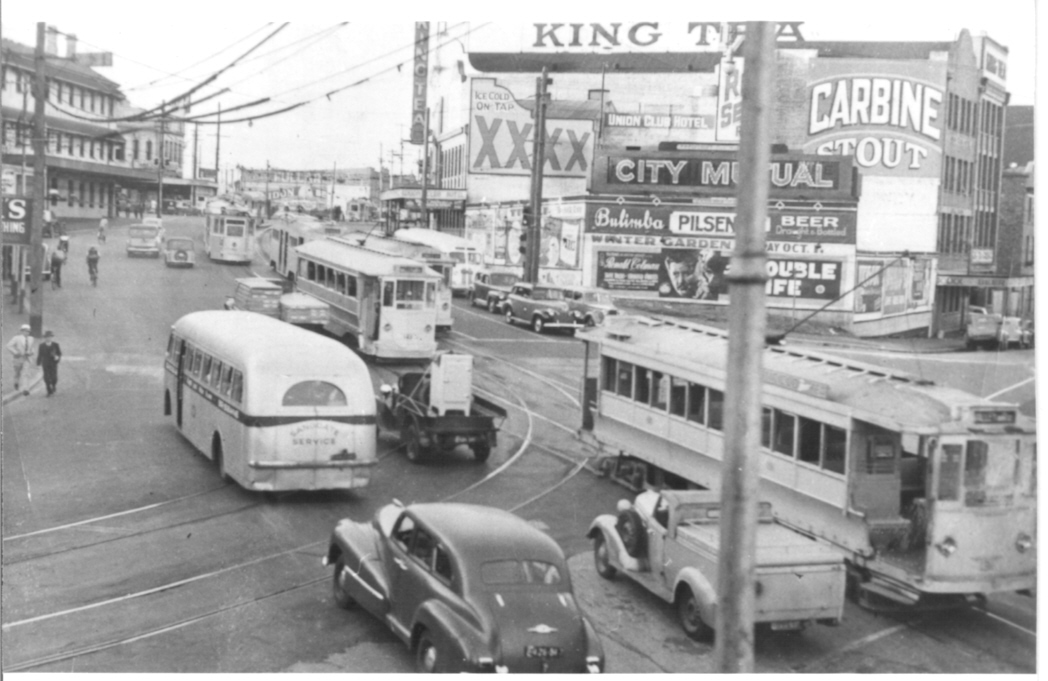
Dreadnoughts and other trams in Queen Street in 1947

Officially referred to as standard centre-aisle trams, 65 trams in this class built between 1908 and 1925. These trams could carry 90 passengers. The last 21, which were built for the Brisbane Tramways Trust between 1924 and 1925, had 12 windows, remainder built with 6 windows. Originally they were built with open end platforms, but these were enclosed in the 1930s. Some received "streamlining" with oval windows and skirting around their bogies. The attached picture illustrates the differences between various members of this class. The tram in the foreground is a 12 window Dreadnought (built by the Tramways Trust), still with seats on its end platforms and no streamlining. The tram ahead of it is an older, 6 window Dreadnought (built by the Tramways Company), but with its end seats removed and streamlining around its windows and skirting below the body of the tram.

===== "Special" Dreadnoughts =====
Each of these four cars was unique in their own way. Two were outwardly like the Dreadnoughts. Tram 100 was built in 1903 as the Tramway Company Manager's personal "Palace" car, fitted with carpets, plush seat covers and further interior decorations. Converted to regular passenger use in 1918 and was withdrawn from service in 1958. Tram 110 was built in 1906 as the prototype for the Dreadnoughts, but it had different trucks, which resulted in high steps. It was withdrawn from service in 1952. Tram 101 was built in 1899 originally with no solid roof, just a canvas awning suspended from a lightweight frame. It was withdrawn from service around 1935. Tram 104 was converted in 1943 from a Brill 12 bench car that had been badly damaged in an accident. In its converted form this tram had design features derived from the Four Motor, Dropcentre and Baby Dreadnought tram designs. It was withdrawn from service in 1958.

===== Stepless Car =====
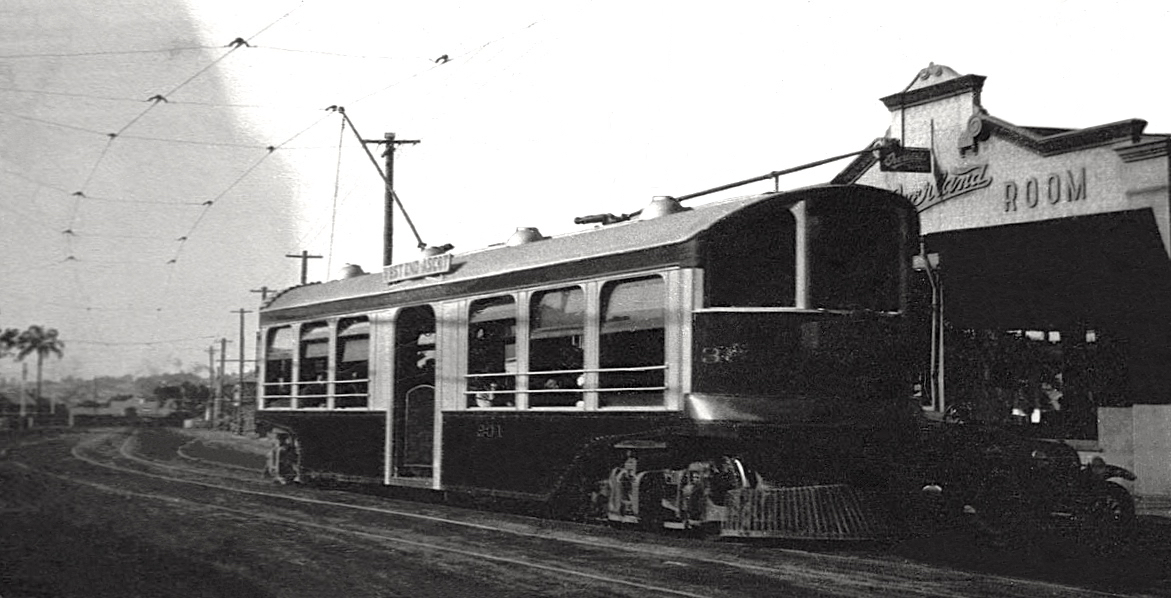
Stepless car No. 301

Known as "big Lizzie", also sometimes referred to as a "New York type tram", tram 301 was intended to be the first of a fleet of inter-urban trams. It was built by J. G. Brill Company in 1912 and imported in 1914. It was unusual for a Brill stepless car in that it was partially made of timber, rather than the normal all-metal construction. It was the first fully enclosed tram in Brisbane. Heavy and troubled by poor road clearance, it usually only saw service on the West End – Ascot line and was withdrawn from service in 1935.

===== "One man" trams =====
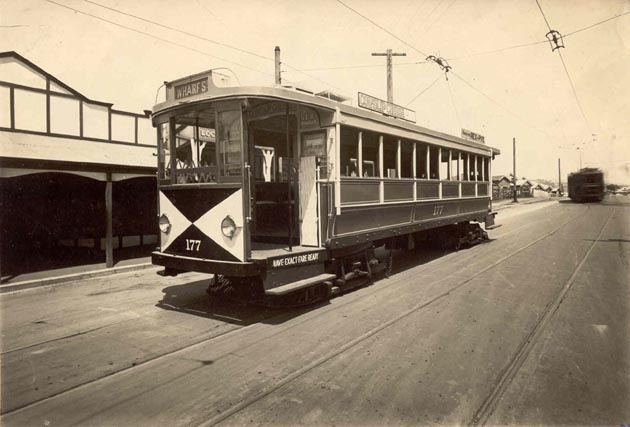
One-man tram, 1929

Between 1929 and 1930, 9 Dreadnoughts were converted to "one-man" operation, as a cost-saving measure. These trams were operated with drivers only and without conductors. They were only used on the Rainworth and Red Hill routes. Passengers were required to enter the tram from the front entrance and pay the driver as they entered. For this reason these trams had a distinctive colour scheme which included red and white diamonds on their front aprons. In May 1934 one man operation was abandoned and these trams were repainted in normal colours.

Two combination trams were also converted to one man operation for use on the Gardens route. The first tram was converted in 1925, the second in 1930.

===== "Baby" Dreadnoughts =====
Sometimes called "small centre-aisle" or "single truck saloon" cars, the 6 trams in this class were built primarily for the hilly Spring Hill route. They were built in two batches: the first four in 1936 were converted from 10 bench trams, the last two were built in 1943 using the underframes from 10 bench trams, making the last two trams in this class the last non-bogie cars built in Australia. These trams were fitted with special sanders allowing sand to be dropped not only in front, but also behind, their wheels, in case the trams slipped backwards on the steep section of the Spring Hill line. They were withdrawn from service in 1958–1959, one car was preserved.

===== Dropcentres =====
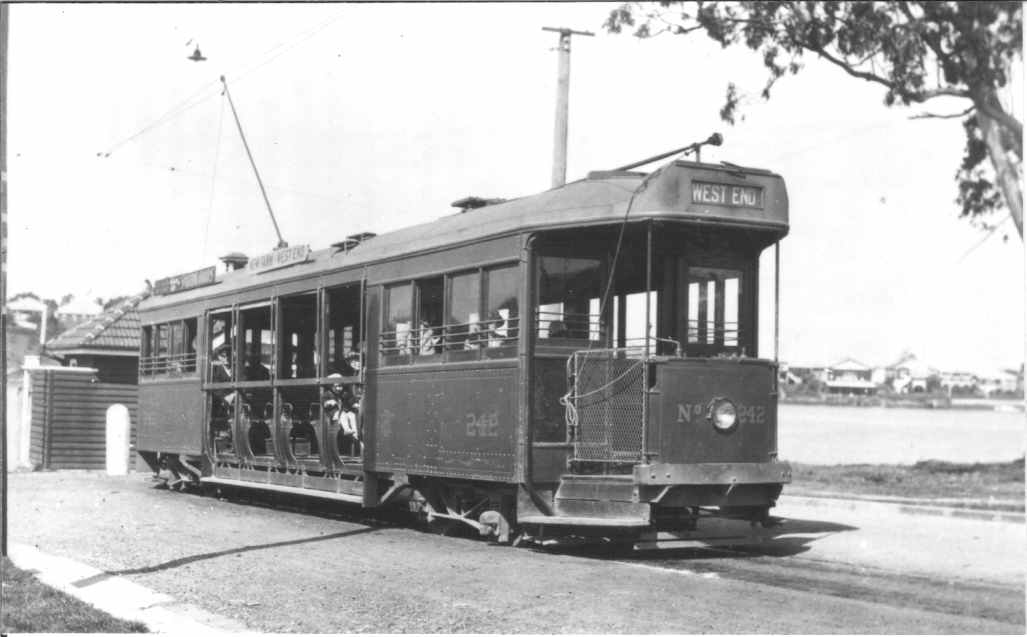
Dropcentre No 242 as new without enclosed ends at New Farm Ferry terminus; c. 1925

The most numerous of Brisbane's trams, there were 191 trams of this class built between 1925 and 1938. Officially called "bogie drop centre combination cars", (usually shortened to "dropcentre" or "droppie") these trams' distinctive drop centre compartment was open to the elements, with only canvas blinds to provide protection for passengers in cold or wet weather. Although designed to be operated using airbrakes, most cars in this class were instead built with rheostatic brakes and hand brakes. However, the last 17 cars (Nos 370–386) were built with airbrakes. Subsequently, many of the older cars in this class were retrofitted with airbrakes and had their rheostatic braking systems removed. Early cars were built with open ends (meaning the drivers were unprotected from the elements) but later cars were built with enclosed ends (or "vestibules"). The ends of all the earlier cars of this class were enclosed by 1934. These trams were last used in regular service in December 1968.

===== Four Motor (FM) trams =====
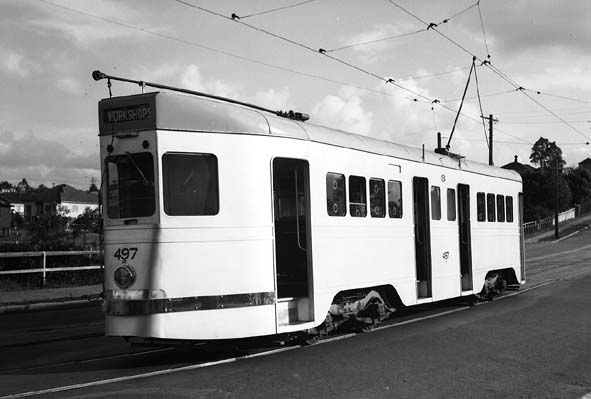
Four Motor tram 497 at Milton in 1949

Officially referred to as "drop centre saloon cars", or "four motor cars", they were popularly referred to as "400s", "FM's" or "silver bullets". They were the first class of trams built in Brisbane with airbrakes. 155 were constructed by the Brisbane City Council between 1938 and 1964, with a maximum carrying capacity of 110 passengers. Trams 400–472 were built with wide centre doors, 407 was altered to narrow centre doors and renumbered 473 (and the tram to be numbered 473 entered service as 407), trams 474–554 built with narrow centre doors. Through the 28 years during which they were built, many innovations were introduced, such as fluorescent lighting, helical gears, resilient wheels, remote controlled controllers and streamlined construction techniques. Early versions had canvas blinds in the doorways, while later versions had sliding doors. The last 8 trams were built from components salvaged from the Paddington tram depot fire and were painted light blue with phoenix emblems below the motorman's windows, to symbolise that the trams had risen from the ashes of the fire.

== Depots ==
Tram Depots were located at the following places:

Depot	Location	Coordinates	Opened	Closed	Notes
Light Street	Fortitude Valley	27.4522°S 153.0398°E	1885	1968	The site then became Light st bus depot, and currently houses the "EMPORIUM" complex
Logan Road	Buranda		1897(?)	1927	
Countess Street	City		1897	1927	
Lang Street (now Tamar Street)	Dutton Park		1912	1927	
La Trobe Terrace	Paddington		1915	1962	Now Paddington Central shopping centre
Ipswich Road	Annerley	27.5005°S 153.0355°E	1927	1969	Now the Buranda Village Shopping Centre

Logan Road, Countess Street and Lang Street depots closed in 1927 with the opening of Ipswich Road depot. Ipswich Road and Light Street depots continued to be used as bus depots after the closure of the tram system.

The Brisbane City Council had planned to replace Paddington depot with a new depot on Mount Coot-tha Road, Toowong, however following the destruction of Paddington tram depot in 1962 with the loss of 65 trams, these plans were shelved and a bus depot was developed on the site instead.

=== Tram allocation as at 1961 ===
Depot	Dreadnoughts	Hand-brake Dropcentres	Air-brake Dropcentres	Four Motor trams	Total
Ipswich Road	15	46	31	55	147
Light Street	8	25	35	51	119
Paddington	5	32	22	40	99
Total	28	103	88	146	365

== Uniforms ==
Prior to World War II tram drivers (or motormen) and conductors wore a dark blue uniform including a serge jacket, which was subsequently replaced with a lighter cotton blouson. Until 1961 crews wore foreign legion caps. In 1967 the blue uniform was replaced with a green one. Inspectors wore a black uniform, with a grey shirt and black cap.

== Routes ==
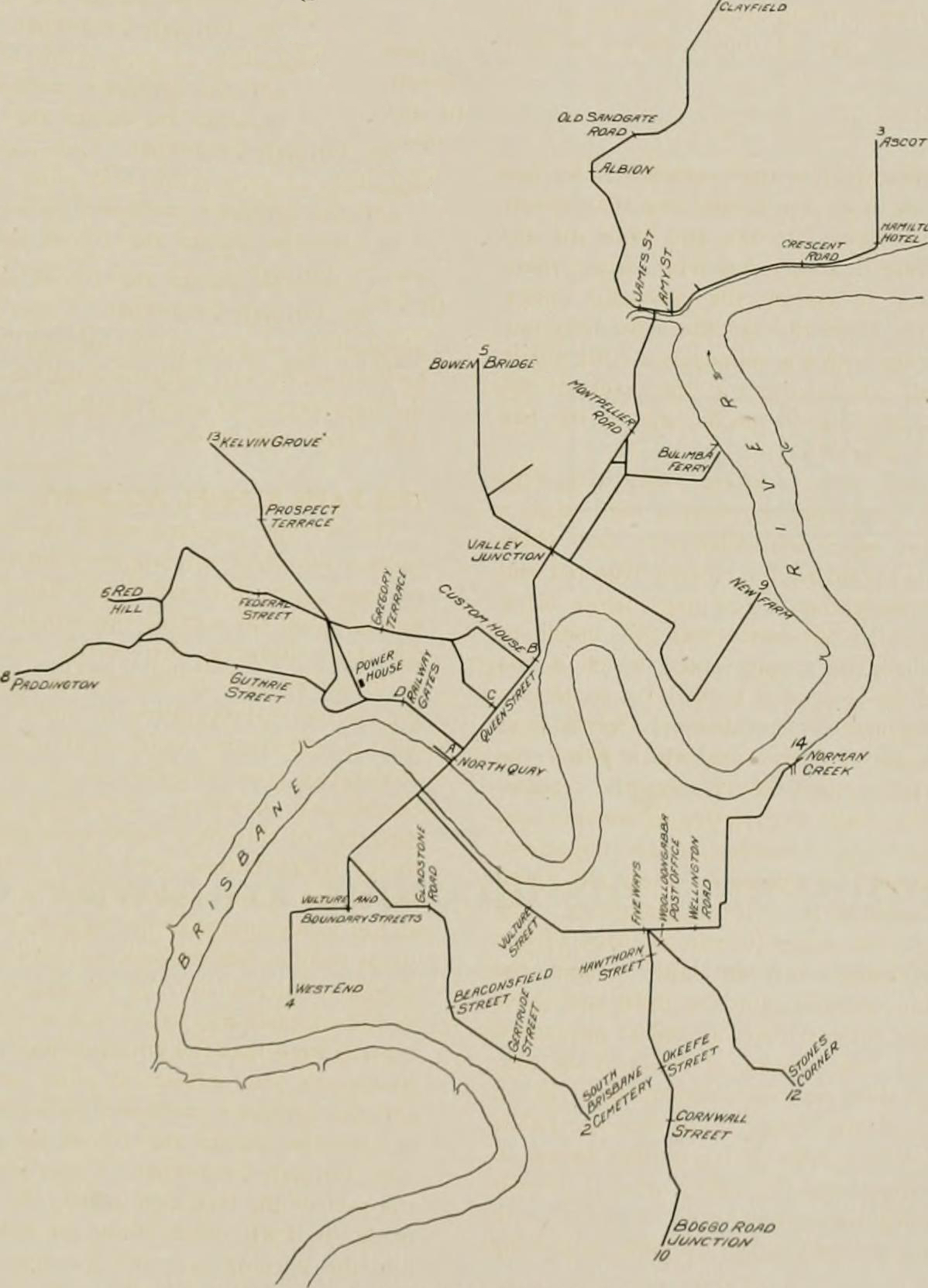
Network in 1903

Network in 1941

=== Horse tram routes ===
Horse Trams ran to the following suburbs:

- New Farm
- Breakfast Creek (Newstead)
- Bulimba Ferry (Newstead)
- Exhibition Show Grounds
- West End
- Logan Road (Buranda)

=== Electric tram routes ===
Trams did not terminate in the Brisbane central business district, but ran from suburbs on one side of the city to suburbs on the other. Today, many all-stops bus routes (shown in italics) roughly correspond with the former tram lines.

In 1961 trams ran on the following routes:

- Fortitude Valley – Belmont 06 (Current equivalent bus route 204)
- South Brisbane – St Pauls Terrace 08
- Ascot Doomben – Balmoral 60
- Ascot Oriel Park – Balmoral 70 (Toombul to Cultural Centre 300; Valley to Balmoral 230)
- Clayfield – Salisbury 71 (Toombul to Cultural Centre 306/322; Valley to Salisbury 117/124/125)
- Chermside – Enoggera 72 (Chermside to City 370; City to Brookside Shopping Centre 390) (Formerly Chermside to Enoggera 172)
- Kalinga – Rainworth 73 (Toombul to City 321; Valley to Rainworth 475), terminating at Rainworth State School, 185 Boundary Road (27.4665°S 152.9845°E)
- Stafford – Bardon 74 (Route 375), terminating at the junction of Simpsons Road and Morgan Terrace (27.4593°S 152.9759°E)
- Grange – Ashgrove 75 (Stafford to City via Grange 379; City to West Ashgrove 379/380/381)
- Bulimba ferry – Toowong 76 (Teneriffe wharf to Toowong 470)
- New Farm Park – West End 77 (New Farm to City 196; City to West End wharf 199)
- New Farm wharf – Dutton Park 78 (Teneriffe wharf to City 199; City to Fairfield via Dutton Park 196) (27.4616°S 153.0501°E)
- Fortitude Valley – Mount Gravatt 79 (Valley to Garden City via Mount Gravatt Central 174/175)

Routes which closed prior to 1961 were:

- Spring Hill – noted for its exceptionally steep track in Edward Street and operated by hand braked single truck trams (see "baby dreadnoughts" above). Closed 1947.
- Gardens – This line branched off Queen Street and ran down Edward Street to the Brisbane River. It was notable for its driver only operation, where passengers paid their fares into a box upon entering the tram. Closed 1947. Initially replaced with diesel buses, it was converted to trolley bus operation in 1951 along with the Spring Hill line. (Spring Hill Loop – weekdays only)
- Red Hill – This line branched off Musgrave Road Red Hill and ran along Enoggera Terrace. After closure this line was retained as a link to Paddington tram depot.
- Chatsworth Road, Greenslopes – This short line branched off Logan Road. For some years before closure it was only used for peak hour services. Last used in 1957.
- Cavendish Road, Coorparoo – This line branched off Old Cleveland Road at Coorparoo. Closed 1955. Converted to trolley-bus. (Valley to Garden City via Cavendish Road 184/185)

== Workshops, power houses and administration ==
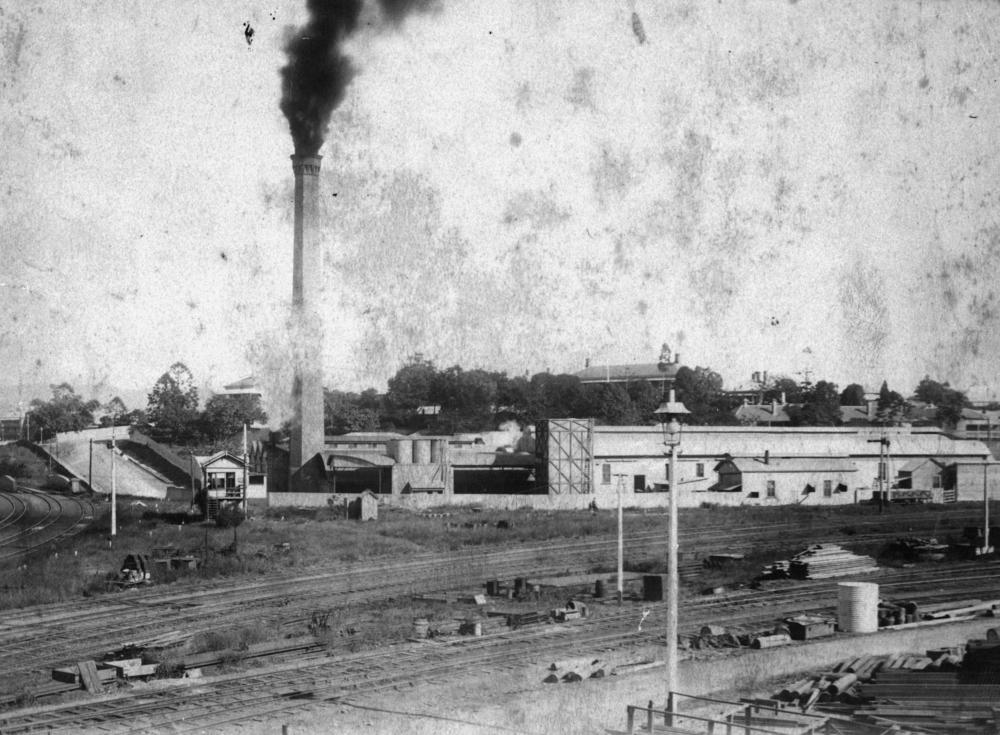
The tramway powerhouse and workshops complex in Countess Street, seen from the east, with rail lines into Roma Street station in the foreground

Workshops and administration for the electric tram system were initially located in cramped quarters at Countess Street, at the western side of the Roma Street railway yards (now the site of the Roma Street Parkland), but in 1927 were relocated to Milton. Access to the workshops was from Boomerang Street in Milton, off Milton Road. Head Office was accessed from Coronation Drive (then known as River Road).

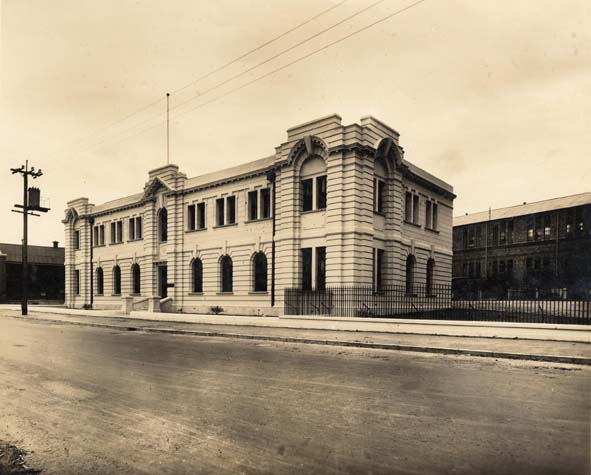
The Brisbane City Council Tramways Department administration building in Milton, with workshops behind

Power for the electric trams was originally drawn from a power station operated by the tramway company adjacent to its Countess Street depot and workshops. As the tramway company increased both the number of trams and the length of routes, the power supply rapidly became inadequate. Additional power generating units were installed at Light Street depot and a further powerhouse was built on Logan Road, Woolloongabba, adjacent to the Woolloongabba railway line. Inadequate power supply was to remain a problem while the tramways remained in private hands. With the takeover of the system in 1922 by the Brisbane Tramways Trust (and subsequently the City Council) considerable investment was made in many areas including power generation and distribution. A larger powerhouse was built in New Farm which commenced generation in 1928 and was sufficient for both the needs of the tram system and other consumers.

The original Countess Street powerhouse was demolished and material from it was used to construct the new Tramways headquarters.

=== Location of electrical substations at the time of closure ===
- Ballow Street, Fortitude Valley
- Russell Street, South Brisbane
- Petrie Terrace, Petrie Terrace
- Paddington Tramways Substation at Enoggera Terrace, Paddington
- Newstead Park, Newstead
- Logan Road, Woolloongabba
- Ipswich Road, Annerley
- Lutwyche Road, Windsor (original, northernmost substation)
- Lutwyche Road, Windsor (second, southern substation)
- Substation #8, Kedron Park Road, Wooloowin
- Balmoral Street, Norman Park substation #212
- Substation #9, corner Wynnum Road and Norman Avenue, Norman Park
- Old Cleveland Road, Coorparoo
- Waterworks Road, Ashgrove
- Kingsford Smith Drive, Hamilton
- Enoggera Road Newmarket
- Logan Road, Holland Park
- Oriel Road, Albion

== Remnants of the former system ==
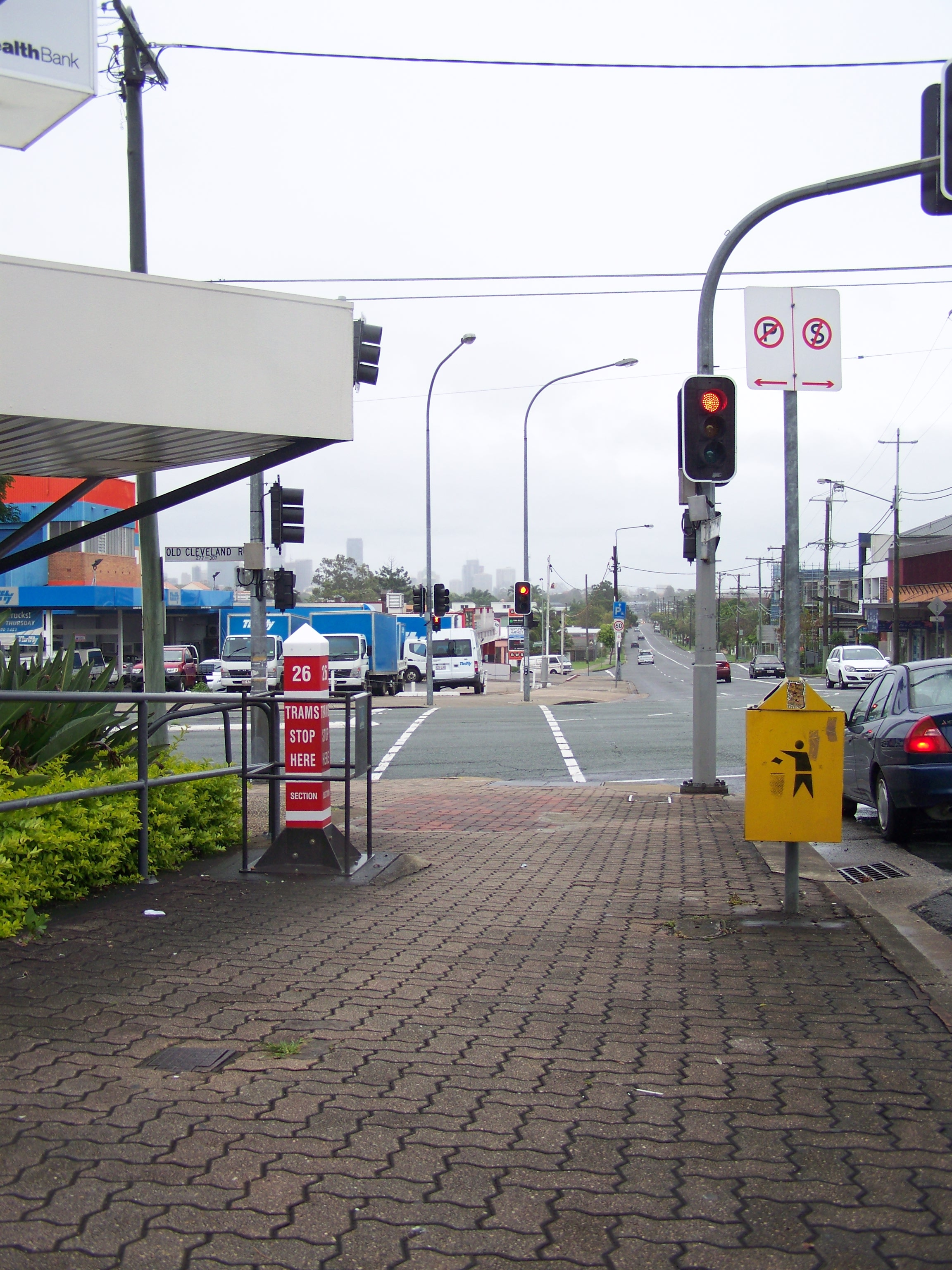
Tram stop in Coorparoo

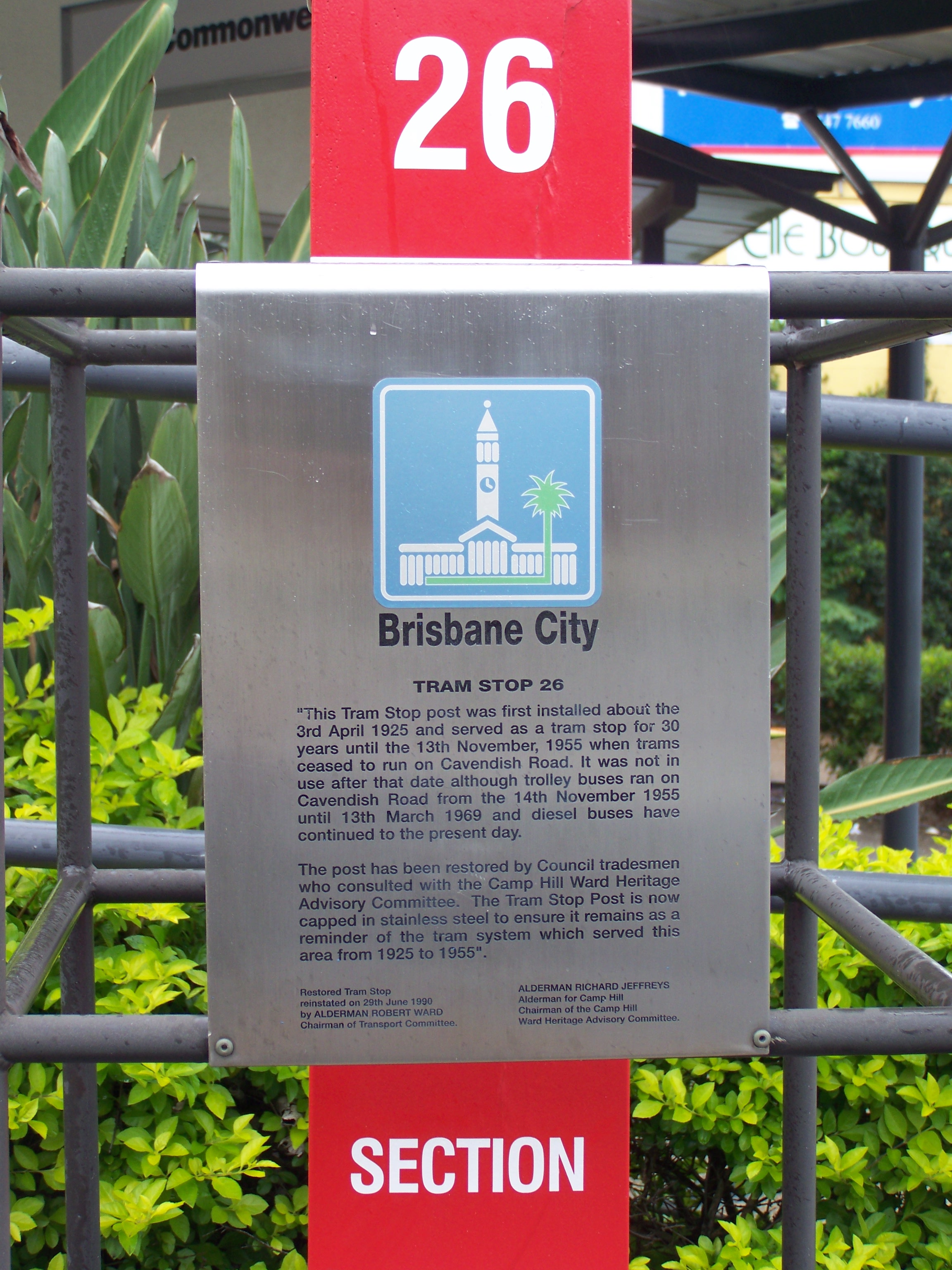
Tram stop plaque

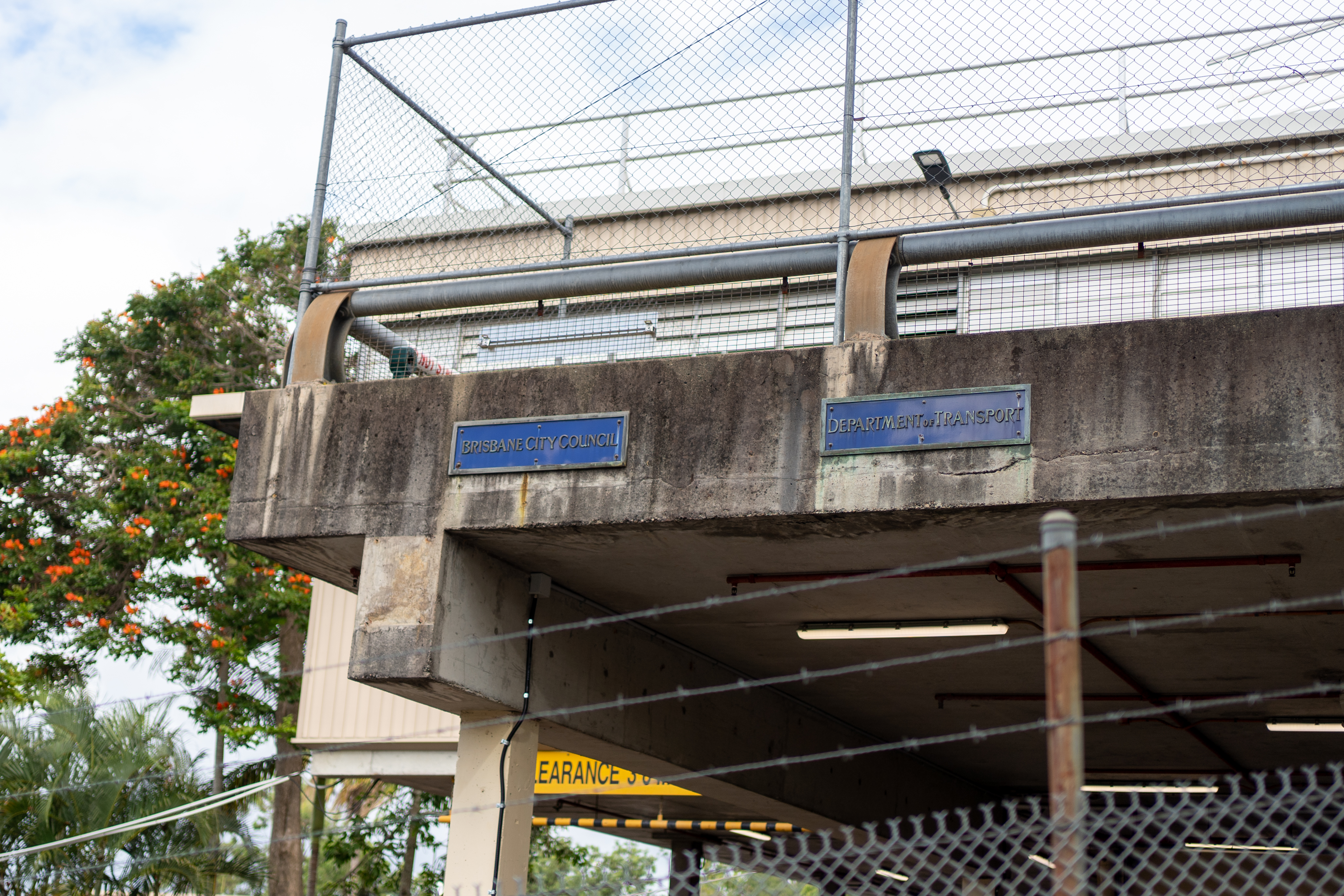
The original "Brisbane City Council" and "Department of Transport" signs on the Dean St entrance to the Toowong bus workshop.

The south-east pylon of the former Victoria Bridge stands on the southern bank of the Brisbane River at South Brisbane, it includes a short stretch of tram track.

500 metres of track remains exposed in the median strip of Old Cleveland Road from Camp Hill to Carina. It is heritage-listed as the Old Cleveland Road Tramway Tracks. The proposed Eastern Busway, Brisbane might require much of this remaining track to be dug up, or covered over during road realignment.

Most of the former electrical substations remain, with only Russell Street substation demolished and the Logan Road substation dismantled and relocated to the town of Murgon, near that town's railway station. Tramways Substation No. 6 at Windsor, Brisbane City Council Tramways Substation No. 8 at Wooloowin, Tramways Substation No 9 at Norman Park and Paddington Tramways Substation are all heritage-listed.

Numerous four-poster and two-poster timber waiting sheds continue to serve as shelters along former tram lines, including:

- Woodstock Road tram shed, and tram track in Toowong
- Tram waiting shed at Ithaca Town Council Chambers in Red Hill

However, some shelters have been moved from their original position.

Stop number 26, a red "tram stop" post, still remains at the corner of Old Cleveland and Cavendish Roads, however the post was moved from its original position, when the intersection was modified in the mid 1980s.

A number of buildings in the CBD and inner suburbs retain brackets (or "rosettes") where tramway overhead was attached. A notable example is the Adelaide Street frontage of the Brisbane City Hall.

The original blue "Brisbane City Council" and "Department of Transport" signs from the former Coronation Drive head office are now located on the north west corner of Transport for Brisbane's Toowong bus workshops.

Timber span poles remain along many of the former tram lines. These poles can be distinguished from other poles by their distinctive conical tops (some retaining cast iron caps resembling inverted flower pots) and by having small holes facing the street high up, where the span wires were attached.

The road overpass at Dutton Park railway station retains two large steel tram span poles.

Canning Bridge at Norman Park retains its four metal tram span poles.

As of 2006, much of the tram system's track remains in situ, as it was laid in concrete. It has merely been covered by bitumen, and can occasionally be seen when the bitumen road surface breaks. Reason for the track to be left in situ and covered over was, it took 2 years to remove 2 miles of track on the Kalinga tramline after it was closed, B.C.C. Engineers decided it took too long and was prohibitively expensive to remove the track.

== See also ==
- Brisbane Tramway Museum
- Rail transport in Queensland
- Trams in Australia
- Brisbane Tramways Substation No. 6 at Windsor
- Brisbane City Council Tramways Substation No. 8 at Wooloowin
- Brisbane City Council Tramway Substation No 9 at Norman Park
- Endrim, Woodstock Road tram shed, and tram track at Toowong
