= Paddington tram depot fire =

1962 fire in Brisbane, Australia

Coordinates: 27°27′31.92″S 152°59′52.34″E

The Paddington tram depot fire occurred on the night of 28 September 1962, and was one of the largest fires in Brisbane's history. As well as the depot, 67 trams were destroyed, 20% of the city's fleet. The destruction of the depot is generally seen as the beginning of the end for Brisbane's tram system, providing the justification for the subsequent closure of four tram routes and the gradual encroachment of bus operation on other tram routes, with the final closure of the tram system occurring on 13 April 1969.

== Depot ==
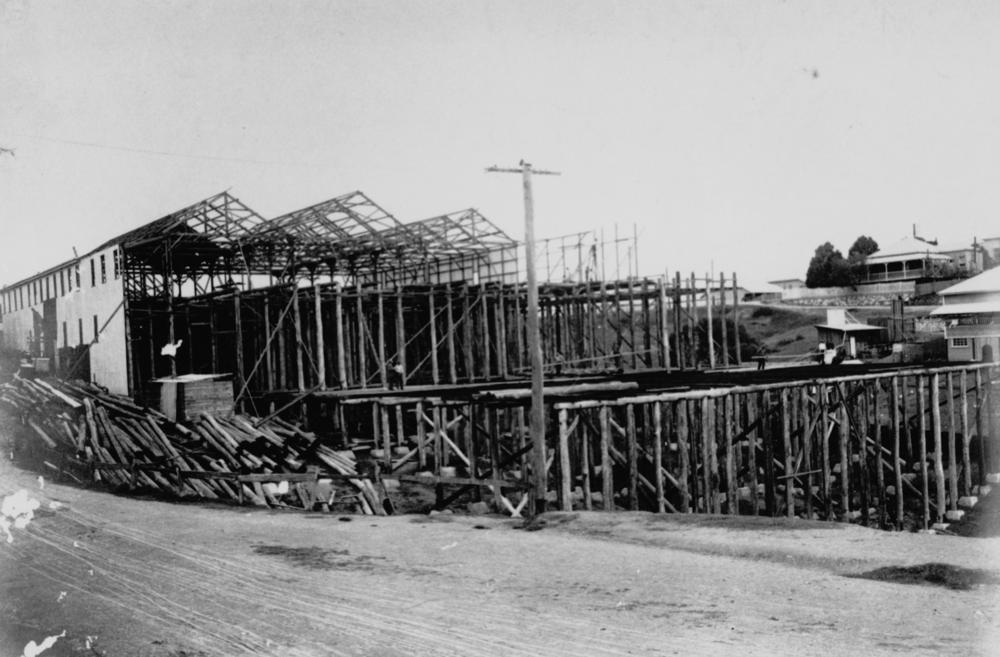
A 1915 photo showing the depot under construction

The depot was constructed in 1915 on Latrobe Terrace, Paddington by the Brisbane Tramways Company to service its western suburbs routes. Initially the depot had 10 roads, but it was subsequently lengthened and widened to 13 roads.

It was on the side of a hill and was largely built of timber and corrugated iron panels. The front of the depot was at street level, but owing to the slope of the site, the rear of the depot was supported by a forest of timber supports, some over 50 feet (15 m) high.

== Fire ==
It is believed that the fire started in a storage area underneath the depot, although the cause has never been fully determined. Around 7:30 pm depot staff were alerted by nearby residents who had noticed sparks falling from under the depot. Staff first secured the depot's cash in the depotmaster's car and then attempted to drive some trams out of the depot. Three trams were rescued before the fire cut the power to the depot. Firefighting was hampered by very low water pressure. As the fire progressed, burning trams periodically crashed through the weakened floor to the ground below. When it became obvious that the building could not be saved, firefighters concentrated on ensuring the fire did not spread to neighbouring homes. The fire, fuelled by tyres, oil and grease stored under the depot, was visible from many areas of Brisbane.

== Impact ==
The loss of so many trams put considerable strain on the Brisbane City Council Transport Department. Trams allocated to the depot that were in service at the time of the fire were temporarily stored at the Tramways workshops in Milton. The City Council admitted that neither the trams nor the depot had been insured.

Initially, older-style trams were brought out of storage from other depots to assist with peak-hour demand, but in December 1962 tram services to Kalinga, Toowong, Rainworth and Bulimba Ferry (in the suburb of Newstead) were converted to diesel bus operation. These closures were the first significant route closures of the system and within 6½ years, the remainder of Brisbane's tram routes had been converted to diesel bus operation.

The City Council hired a number of buses from the New South Wales government, in a move which some saw as a publicity stunt by the then Lord Mayor, Alderman Clem Jones. The Courier-Mail newspaper revealed that the City Council had been storing several of its own buses, which could have been made available rather than hiring buses from New South Wales.

Irrespective of the brief and comparatively minor controversy over the use of the Sydney buses, Jones was able to argue that the availability of buses "to fill the breach" left by the fire was evidence of buses' greater operational flexibility compared to trams. One of the justifications subsequently raised by the Brisbane City Council when it decided in 1967 to abandon the tram system completely was the greater operational flexibility of buses.

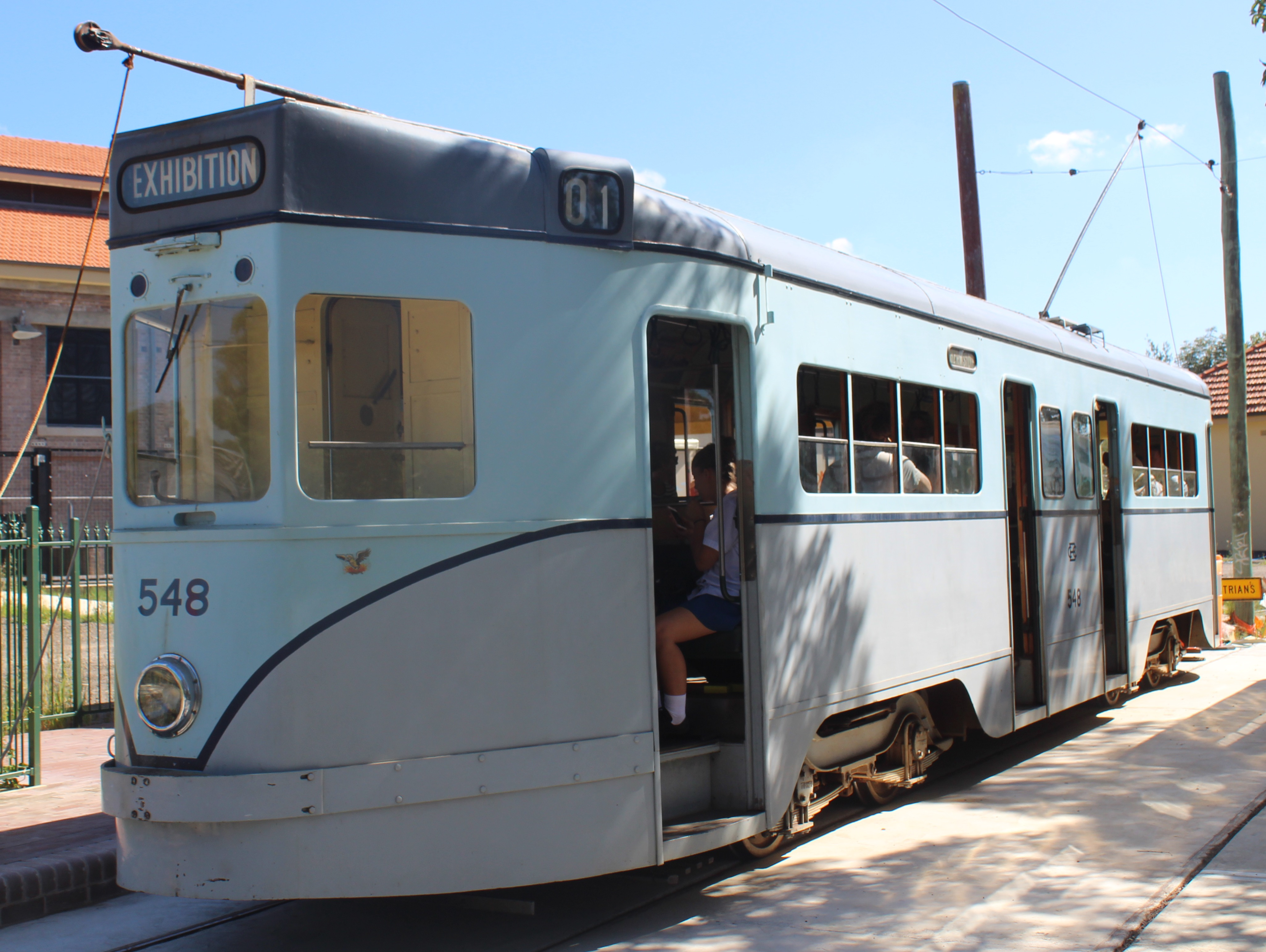
Phœnix tram 548 in service at the Sydney Tram Museum

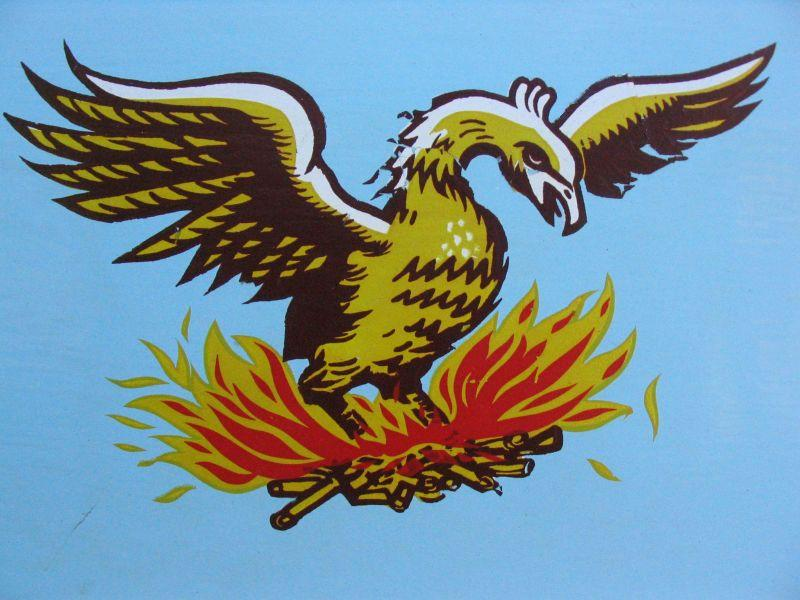
The phoenix emblem displayed on the eight trams built with material salvaged from fire

After the fire a number of components, particularly trucks and wheels, were salvaged from destroyed trams and incorporated in eight new trams. These trams had a distinctive pale blue colour scheme and featured a small picture of a phoenix under the driver's windows, signifying that the trams had "risen from the ashes", and were popularly referred to as "phoenix cars".

== Aftermath ==
After the remains of the depot had been cleared, which took some years, the City Council sold the block and a shopping centre, now known as "Paddington Central" was built on the site. This was redeveloped in the late 1980s, with the new building's roofline echoing the pitched gables of the tram depot.

== See also ==
- Dalsenget fire – a tramway depot fire in Trondheim, Norway
- Woodland trolley depot fire – a trolley depot fire in Philadelphia, Pennsylvania, USA
