= D'Aguilar Range =

Mountain range in Australia

D'Aguilar
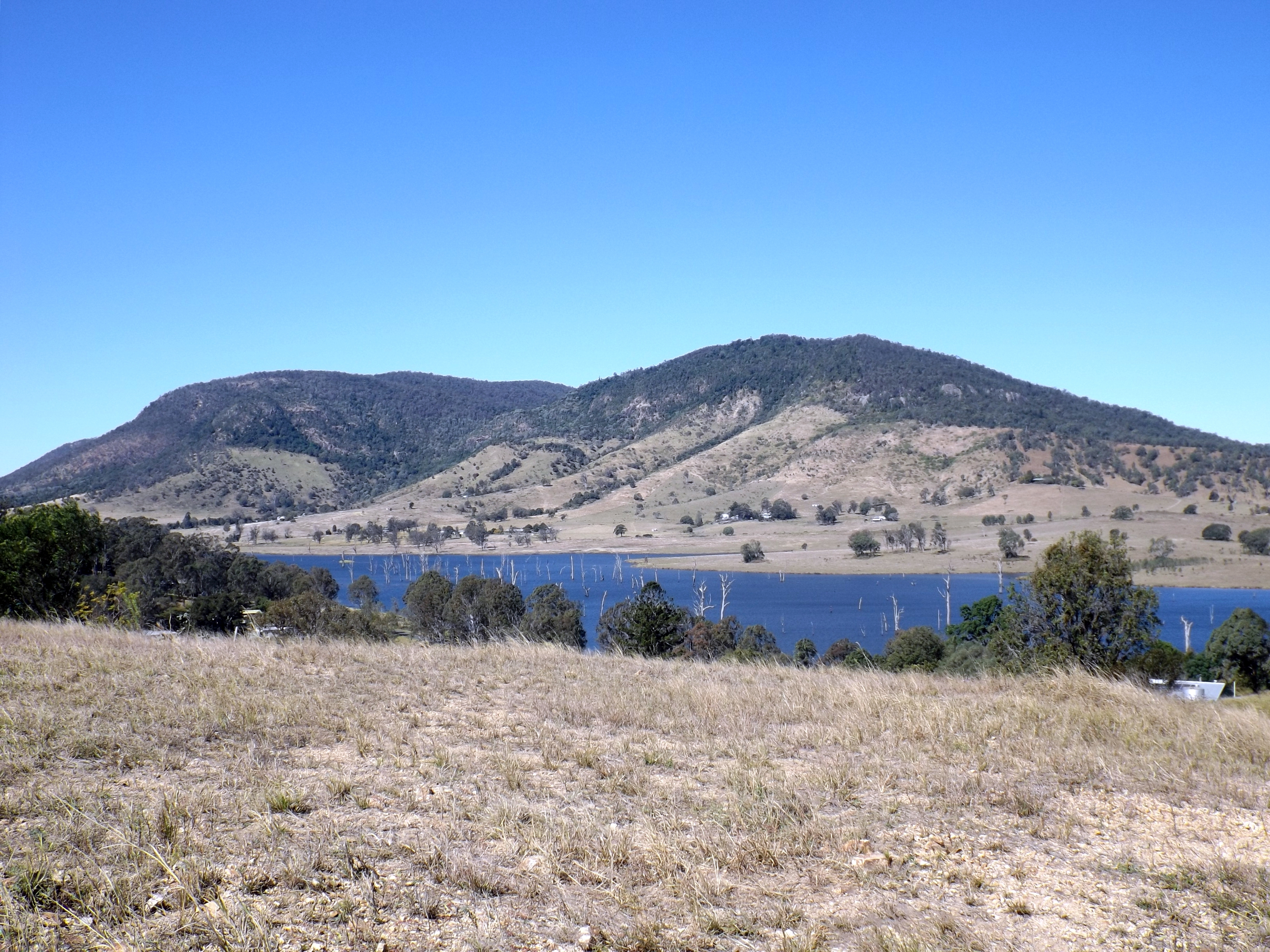
- Mount Archer in the northern D'Aguilar ranges, and Lake Somerset

Highest point
- Peak: Tenison Woods Mountain
- Elevation: 770 m (2,530 ft)

Geography
- Country: Australia
- State: Queensland
- Region: South East Queensland
- Range coordinates: 27°07′57″S 152°47′20″E

The D'Aguilar Range is a mountain range near Brisbane, Queensland, Australia. The town of Dayboro is situated on the lower foothills midway along the range and the Sunshine Coast Hinterland town of Mooloolah lies at the northernmost point of the range. Many residential areas line its eastern slopes including the town of Samford and the suburb of Ferny Hills. In the west, numerous ridges and gullies are heavily forested and designated as state forest or national park.

== Mountains ==
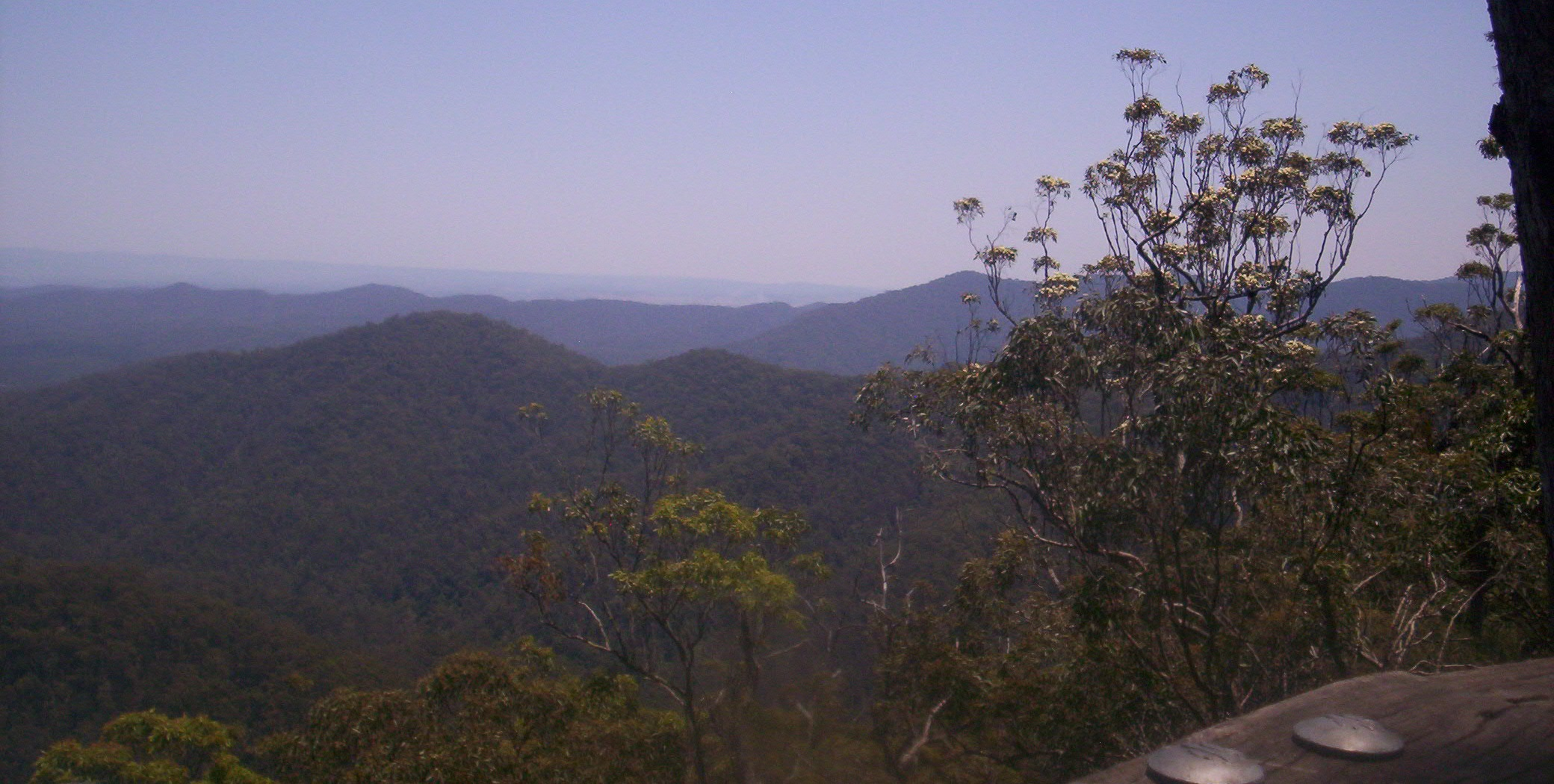
Westridge Outlook at D'Aguilar Range

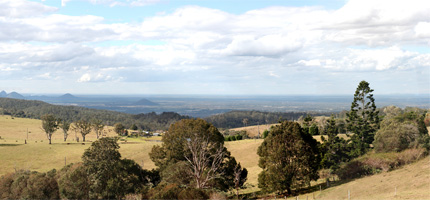
View from Mount Mee

The D'Aguilar Range stretches from Caboolture 45 kilometres north of Brisbane, Queensland, through to Brisbane, where part of the D'Aguilar Range is covered by a protected parkland called the Brisbane Forest Park.

Eastern foothills in Samford Valley.

Mountains in the range include Camp Mountain, Mount Nebo, Mount Pleasant, Mount Glorious, Mount Samson and Mount Mee. Directly to the south in the west of Brisbane is the Taylor Range, sometimes considered an eastern spur of the D'Aguilar Range. Further north, highly visible from the D'Aguilar Ranges, are the Glass House Mountains.

Mount D'Aguilar at 750 m above sea level is the second highest peak in the range. The highest point is Tenison Woods Mountain at 770 m. This peak is not distinct and is not marked on old maps. The Congregation of the Sisters of Perpetual Adoration created a plaque on the summit to commemorate the naming of the mountain in 1974. The year also marked the centenary of their order which was founded by J.E. Tenison Woods. Mermaid Mountain is the highest point in the southern sections at 396 m in elevation. Well known lookouts on the range include McAfee's Lookout and Jolly's Lookout, both of which have views east across to Moreton Bay.

== Catchments ==
The North Pine River, including Lake Kurwongbah, South Pine River and Caboolture Rivers flow from the range towards the east. To the north and west are the Stanley River and tributaries that flow directly into the Somerset Dam and Wivenhoe Dam catchments. In the southern parts of the range Enoggera Creek, which is dammed by the Enoggera Dam, flows to the east. Gold Creek in the same area flows south into Moggill Creek after being dammed by the Gold Creek Reservoir. Further to the west is Cabbage Tree Creek and the reservoir known as Lake Manchester.

== History ==
The range was named after Sir George Charles d'Aguilar by Sir Thomas Mitchell in 1827. Farmers and timber-getters first settled on the range in the 1840s. Timber logging on the range was instrumental in the development of Dayboro. Operations expanded in the 1870s as loggers removed hoop pine, cedar, silky oak and black bean.

Maiala National Park, the first national park on the range, was declared in 1930.

== See also ==
- List of mountains in Australia
