= Stepped spillway =

Structure for energy dissipated release of flows from a dam or levee

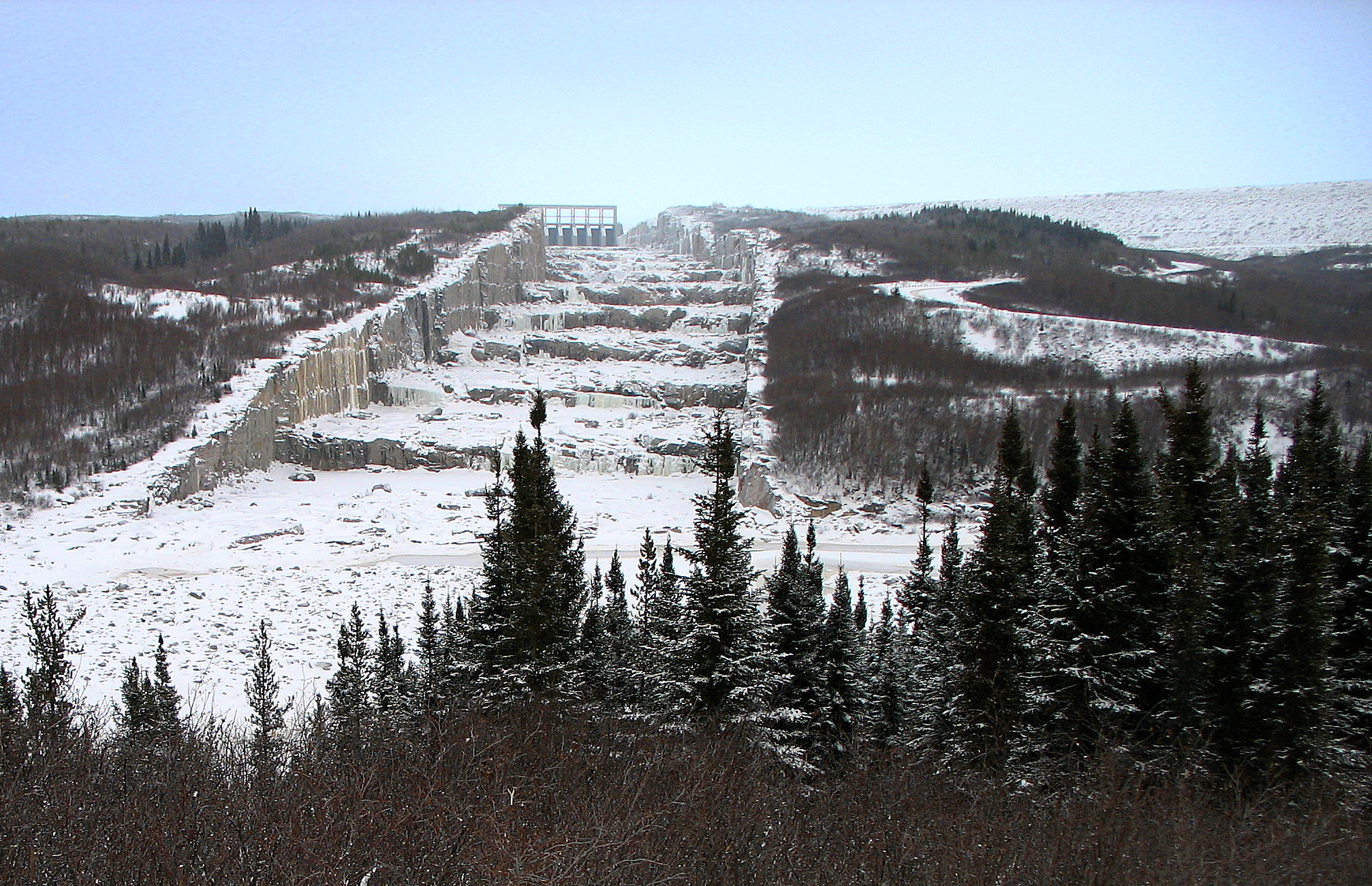
A stepped spillway of the James Bay Project in Canada

A stepped spillway is a spillway with steps on the spillway chute to assist in the dissipation of the kinetic energy of the descending water. This reduces the need for an additional energy dissipator, such as a body of water, at the end of the spillway downstream.

== Historical developments ==
Stepped spillways, consisting of weirs and channels, have been used for over 3,500 years since the first structures were built in Greece and Crete. During Antiquity, the stepped-chute design was used for dam spillways, storm waterways, and in town water supply channels. Most of these early structures were built around the Mediterranean Sea, and the expertise on stepped spillway design was spread successively by the Romans, Muslims, and Spaniards.

Although the early stepped spillways were built in cut-stone masonry, unlined rock, and timber, a wider range of construction materials was introduced during the mid-19th century, including the first concrete stepped spillway of the Gold Creek dam (1890) in Brisbane, Australia. During the first half of the 20th century, the stepped cascade design fell out of fashion, partly because of the maintenance costs but also because of the development of hydraulic jump stilling basins. Yet the long-lasting operation of several famous stepped cascades has demonstrated the soundness of the stepped spillway design.

Although the stepped spillway design was common up to the beginning of the 20th century, a lot of expertise has been lost since, and the present expertise is limited to very simple geometries, namely some flat, horizontal, stepped prismatic chutes, despite some recent interest in stepped spillway design.

== Basic flow characteristics ==
The flow over a stepped spillway may be divided into three distinct flow regimes depending on the flow rate for a given stepped spillway geometry: nappe, transition, and skimming flow regimes with increasing flow rates. For a given stepped spillway geometry, the nappe flows are observed for small discharges. They are characterized by a succession of free-falling nappes at each step edge, followed by nappe impact on the following step. The transition flows are observed for a range of intermediate discharges. Some strong hydrodynamic fluctuations, splashing, and spray near the free surface constitute the main features of this flow regime. To date, the transition flow is avoided for design flow conditions because of past failures.

The skimming flow regime is observed for the largest discharges. The waters skim over the pseudo-bottom formed by the step edges as a coherent turbulent flow. Beneath the pseudo-bottom, some intense recirculation and vertical structures fill the cavities. These recirculation eddies are maintained by the transmission of shear stress from the mainstream, and they contribute significantly to the energy dissipation down the stepped spillway.

For a small dam, the nappe flow is considered most efficient in terms of energy dissipation, while the skimming flow is most efficient for long spillway chutes and large dams.

=== Discussion ===
Gabion stepped weirs are commonly used for embankment protection, river training, and flood control; the stepped design enhances the rate of energy dissipation in the channel, and it is particularly well-suited to the construction of gabion stepped weirs. For very low flow, a porous seepage flow regime may be observed, when the water seeps through the gabion materials and there is no overflow past the step edges.

== See also ==
- Gabion
- Gold Creek Dam
