= Brisbane Forest Park =

Protected area in Brisbane, Queensland, Australia

Coordinates: 27°26′26.17″S 152°55′00.87″E

- Park logo

- Location within Queensland
- Location: Queensland
- Nearest city: Brisbane
- Area: 250 km^{2} (97 sq mi)
- Established: 1977
- Website: https://parks.qld.gov.au/parks/daguilar

Brisbane Forest Park (now officially the southern part of D'Aguilar National Park), is located on parts of the D'Aguilar Range. The large nature reserve lies on the western boundary of City of Brisbane into the City of Moreton Bay, Queensland, Australia, in Enoggera Reservoir, adjacent to The Gap and between the Mount Coot-tha Reserve on the Taylor Range and higher peaks to the north. Brisbane Forest Park supports plants and animals and is essential to their survival. The main entrance is located in the suburb of The Gap although there are a number of other access points.

A number of waterways have their headwaters in the park including South Pine River, Enoggera Creek, Gold Creek, Moggill Creek and its tributary Gap Creek, Cabbage Tree Creek and Cedar Creek, a tributary of Kedron Brook. Lake Manchester Dam, Gold Creek Dam and Enoggera Dam are also located within the park.

== History ==
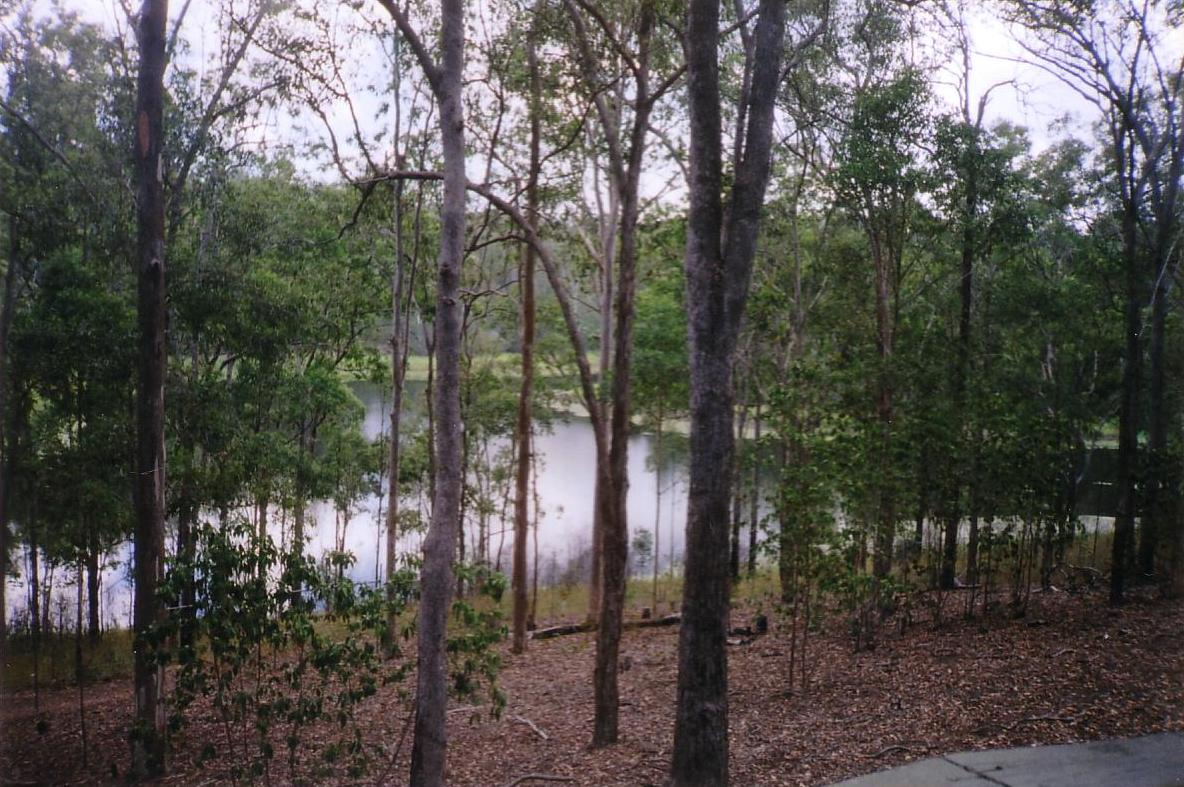
Enoggera Reservoir Dam

The first national park on the D'Aguilar Range, Maiala National Park was declared in 1930. The park was established by a community group called the Brisbane National & Recreation Park Committee. In 1973 the group released a study on the feasibility of establishing a park between Mount Coot-tha and Mount Nebo. Initially the Brisbane City Council was concerned with the incompatibility of opening a public recreation area in a water supply catchment. A co-ordinating authority was set up to allay concerns and an Act of Parliament was passed in 1977 protecting 25 000 hectares.

In 2009, Brisbane Forest Park was renamed and became one of two sections of the D'Aguilar National Park.

== Walkabout Creek Wildlife Centre ==
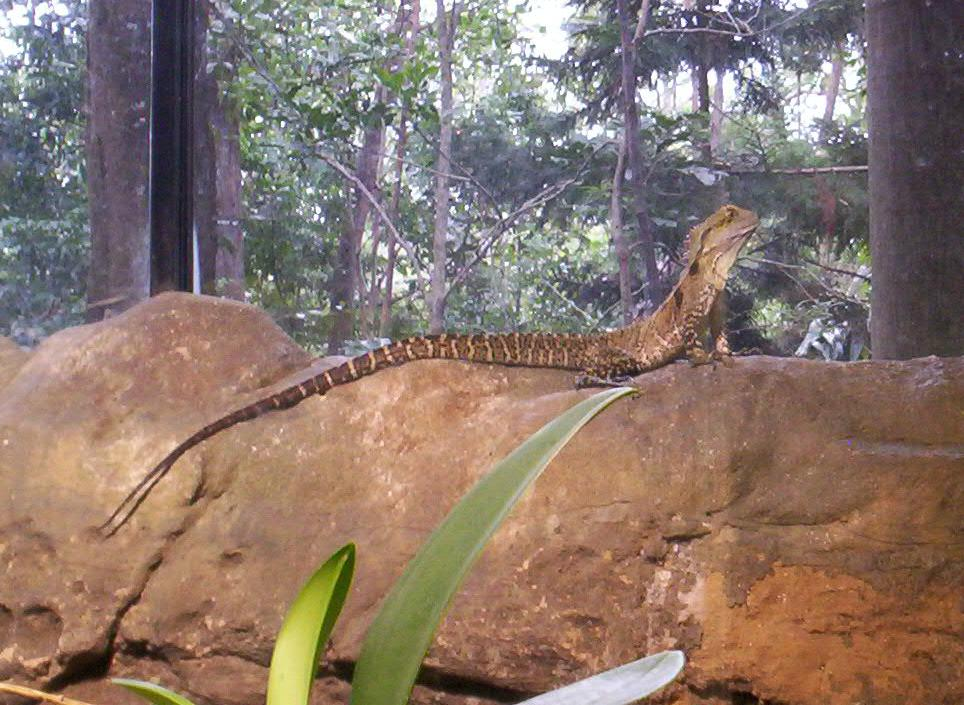
Eastern water dragon at the Walk-About Creek Wildlife Centre

The Walk-About Creek Wildlife Centre (at the Mount Nebo Road, The Gap, entrance to Brisbane Forest Park) has an information and education centre for Australian wildlife, a large walk-through aviary, aquariums and enclosures for wildlife (including a section for Australian nocturnal animals). The nocturnal section also has a pair of satin bowerbirds.

Australian wildlife on display at the Walk-About Wildlife Centre includes Australian native birds, a platypus, short-beaked echidnas, feathertail gliders, striped possums, tree kangaroos, swamp wallabies, bare-nosed wombats, spotted-tail quoll, fat-tailed dunnarts, emus, saltwater crocodile, snakes, lizards, turtles and fish (including lungfish).

Public access to Enoggera Dam is via Walkabout Creek Wildlife Centre.

== Access ==
Brisbane Forest Park is accessible by car.

Many walks are possible in the Brisbane Forest Park with boardwalks erected to protect the area and to make it easier for the walkers. The walk to Greene's Falls leads through rainforest to the top of the waterfall.

== See also ==
- Brisbane native plants
