= Gold Creek Dam =

Dam in south-east Queensland. Australia

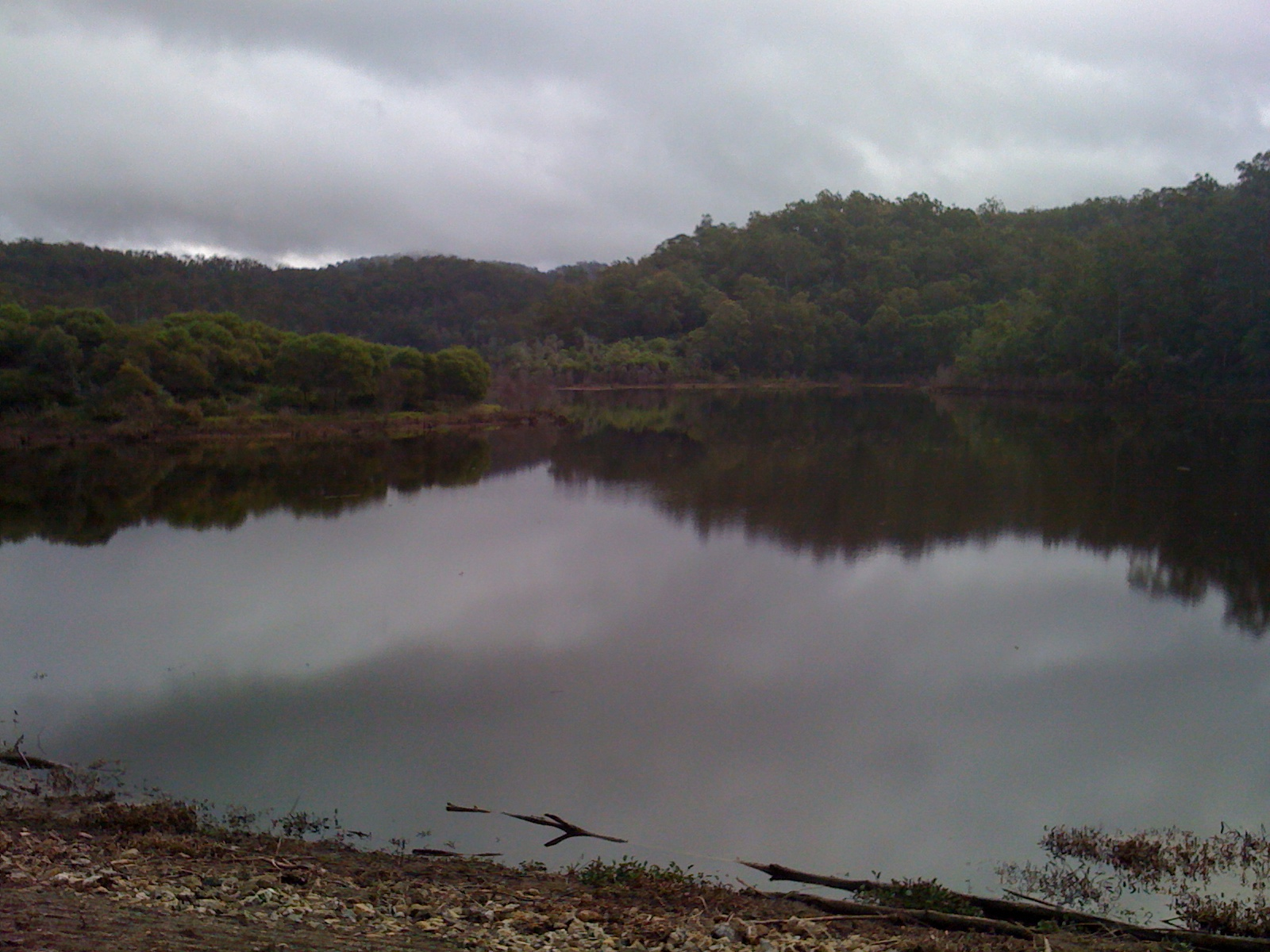
- The reservoir in 2009

- Location of the dam in Queensland
- Interactive map of Gold Creek Dam
- Country: Australia
- Location: South East Queensland
- Coordinates: 27°27′39″S 152°52′52″E
- Purpose: Potable water supply
- Status: Operational
- Construction began: 1881
- Opening date: 1882; upgrade 2005
- Operator: SEQ Water

Dam and spillways
- Type of dam: Earth fill dam
- Impounds: Gold Creek
- Height: 26 m (85 ft)
- Length: 191 m (627 ft)
- Dam volume: 106×10^{3} m^{3} (3.7×10^{6} cu ft)
- Spillway type: Uncontrolled
- Spillway capacity: 132 m^{3}/s (4,700 cu ft/s)

Reservoir
- Creates: Gold Creek Reservoir
- Total capacity: 801 ML (649 acre⋅ft)
- Catchment area: 10.48 km^{2} (4.05 sq mi)
- Surface area: 2.46 ha (6.1 acres)
- Maximum length: 1.2 km (0.75 mi)
- Maximum water depth: 26 m (85 ft)
- Website www.seqwater.com.au

The Gold Creek Dam is an earth-fill embankment dam with an ungated spillway across the Gold Creek that is located in the South East region of Queensland, Australia. The main purpose of the dam is for potable water supply of the Brisbane region. The resultant reservoir is called the Gold Creek Reservoir.

== Location and features ==
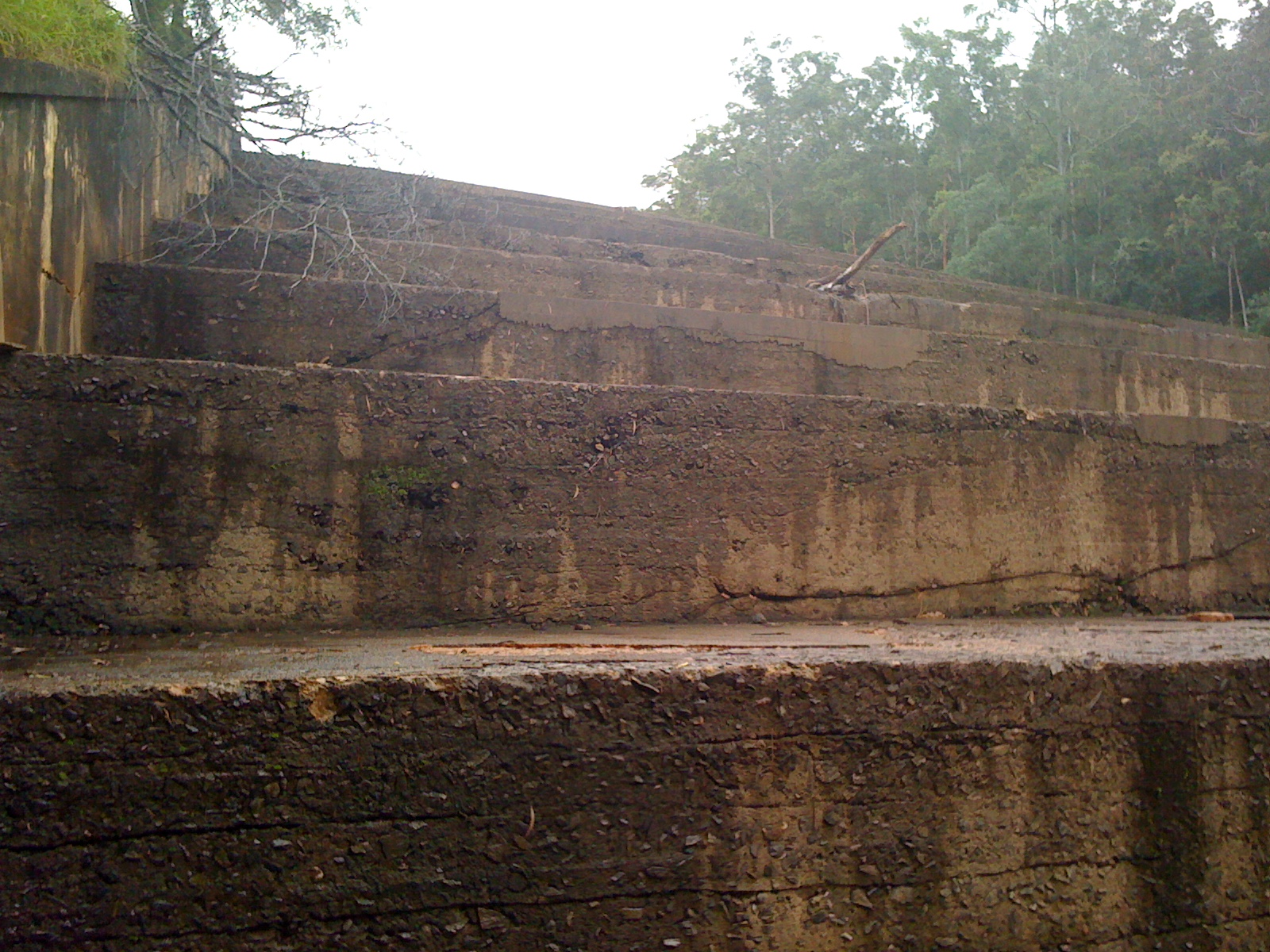
World's first concrete stepped spillway

The Gold Creek Dam is located on the edge of Brisbane Forest Park, 14 kilometres (8.7 mi) west of Brisbane, on the Gold Creek, a tributary of Moggill Creek, to augment supplies from the recently completed Enoggera Dam. Unlike Enoggera, the Gold Creek site could supply water to the most elevated parts of the city.

The earthfill dam structure is 26 metres (85 ft) high and 475 metres (1,558 ft) long. The 106-thousand-cubic-metre (3.7×10^{6} cu ft) dam wall holds back the 801-megalitre (649 acre⋅ft) reservoir when at full capacity. From a catchment area of 10.5 square kilometres (4.1 sq mi), the dam creates a reservoir with an average depth of 26 metres (85 ft). The surface area of the reservoir is 2.46 hectares (6.1 acres). The uncontrolled, ungated spillway has a discharge capacity of 132 cubic metres per second (4,700 cu ft/s). Initially managed by the Brisbane City Council up until 2008, the dam is now managed by Seqwater.

=== Construction ===
The Gold Creek Dam was the second-oldest large dam in Queensland. Construction of the dam was approved in 1881; surveying began in the same year and was completed by April 1882. The dam wall was built between 1882 and 1885. Due to a lack of water, testing of the facilities was not completed until 1886. Construction was more difficult than expected and caused cost overruns and delays, which led to criticism of the Board of Waterworks. The construction tender was won by Ross and Dunbar based on designs developed by J. B. Henderson. The connection to the growing Brisbane population was by a single 16-inch (41 cm), cast-iron pipe that was 20 kilometres (12 mi) in length.

==== Unusual spillway ====
Originally an unlined chute, the dam spillway was damaged during floods in early 1890. It was replaced by an un-reinforced concrete stepped spillway – the first of its type in the world and the precursor of modern roller-compacted concrete (RCC) stepped spillways. The dam and its spillway system were refurbished several times, including in 1974 and 2004. Most of the 1890 concrete stepped spillway cascade is still in use.

== Water supply ==
The council had received complaints about the quality of water it was delivering as early as 1871. Although water supplied from Gold Creek was deemed to be perfectly drinkable in 1883, dry spring and summer weather resulted in the water being described as discoloured, tainted, and foul-smelling. In 1885, the construction of tanks was recommended to allow aeration and sedimentation. After Gold Creek dam was constructed, filtration was also recommended. However, nothing was initiated, partly due to the lack of a suitable location to treat water from both dams, and because wet weather in 1888 resulted in the number of complaints dropping to just a few.

== Access ==
Information board

Gold Creek Dam is reached by traveling to the end of Gold Creek Road, off Brookfield Road in Brookfield. Transport for Brisbane route 435 travels hourly during weekdays from the Indooroopilly Interchange to the Resthaven aged care home at 124 Gold Creek Road, approximately 5 kilometres (3.1 mi) from the Dam. From here to the Dam, Gold Creek Road criss-crosses Gold Creek; it is winding and somewhat narrow but generally flat and suitable for cycling or walking. A steep walking track gives access to the top of the dam at the eastern end; alternatively, a gentle vehicle track gives access to the western end of the top of the dam.

== Recreation ==
At the foot of the dam is a public toilet and an information board. The board shows a map of the dam and the walking track. On-water activities are not permitted, even though the water is no longer used for supply.

=== Walking tracks ===
The Gold Creek Reservoir track is described as 5.5 kilometres (3.4 mi) long. It starts and ends at the dam and circumnavigates the reservoir. It is suitable for running, walking, and mountain biking by a capable rider but not horse riding. Taken clockwise and starting on the western end of the top of the dam, the first 1.5 kilometres (0.9 mi) so is generally a narrow, winding track clinging to steep hillside with some climb. The next 1.5 kilometres (0.9 mi) appears to be formed by repeated use of a quad bike and is generally wider and flatter. The next 1.5-kilometre (0.9 mi) return path along the eastern side of the reservoir is narrow and fairly rugged, climbing and dropping repeatedly. The final 1 kilometre (0.6 mi) back to the foot of the dam is well-formed, reasonably wide, and gentle, with formed steps on the steeper sections. The track finishes from the east by traversing the bottom of the spillway; it is difficult to make out from the foot of the dam. A 1-kilometre (0.6 mi) side-track visiting a hoop pine plantation is described on the information board, which also describes various notable sights on the track. As of March 2010, lantana growth has made these tough to spot. The track is very overgrown and little used, and its route can no longer be seen at the northernmost point. This makes circumnavigation of the dam very difficult.

Walking and riding tracks which travel deep into Brisbane Forest Park also begin here. Gold Creek Reservoir is home to the Pinnacles Classic, a small trail-running event held in mid-April which uses a hilly, roughly rectangular 18-kilometre (11 mi) course which uses Gold Creek Boundary Break, South Boundary Road, and the Gold Creek Trail, starting and finishing at the gate at Gold Creek Road. The event reverses direction each year, with clockwise races held in even numbered years.

== Gallery ==
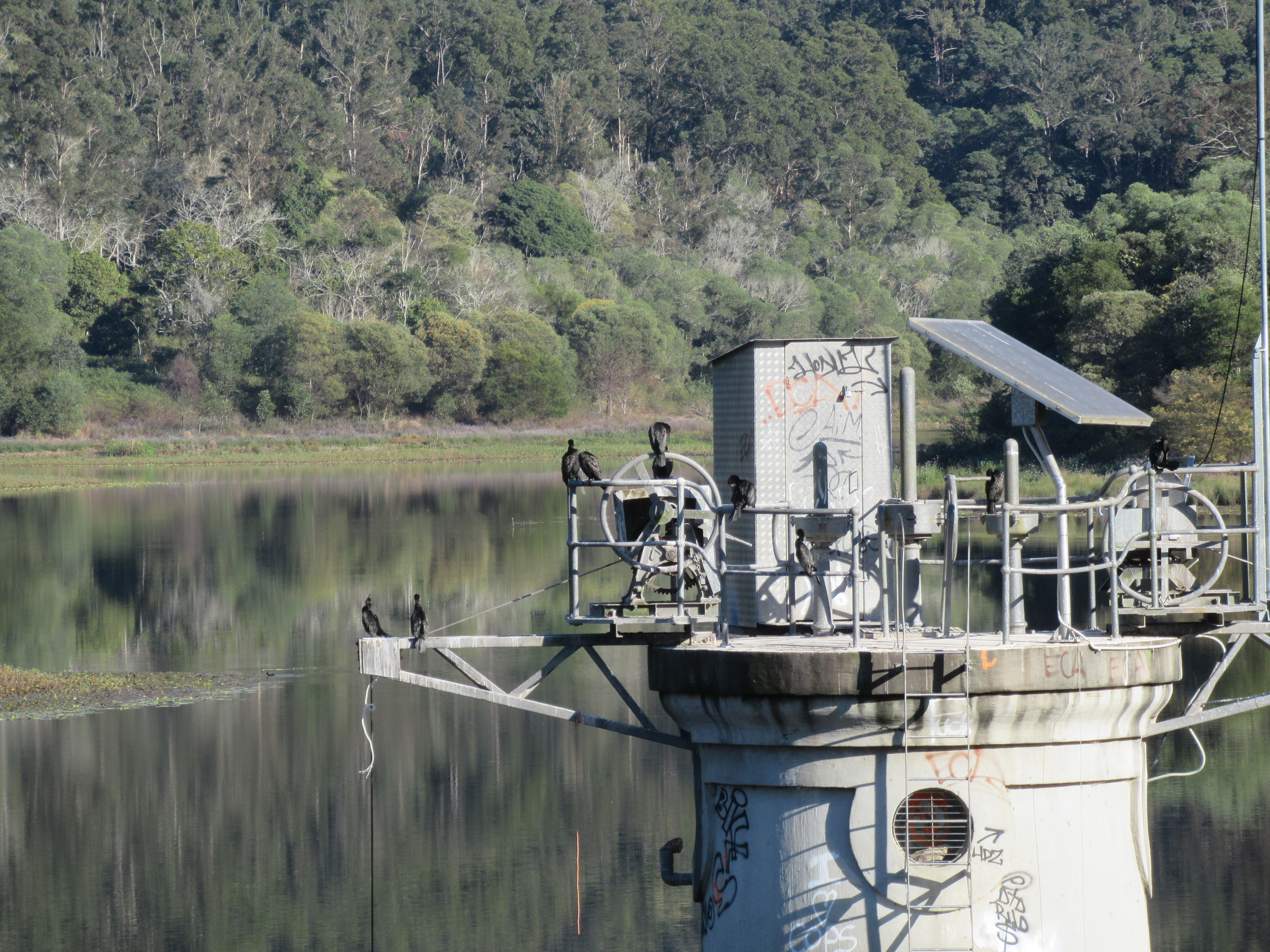
The dam tower with Little Black Cormorants

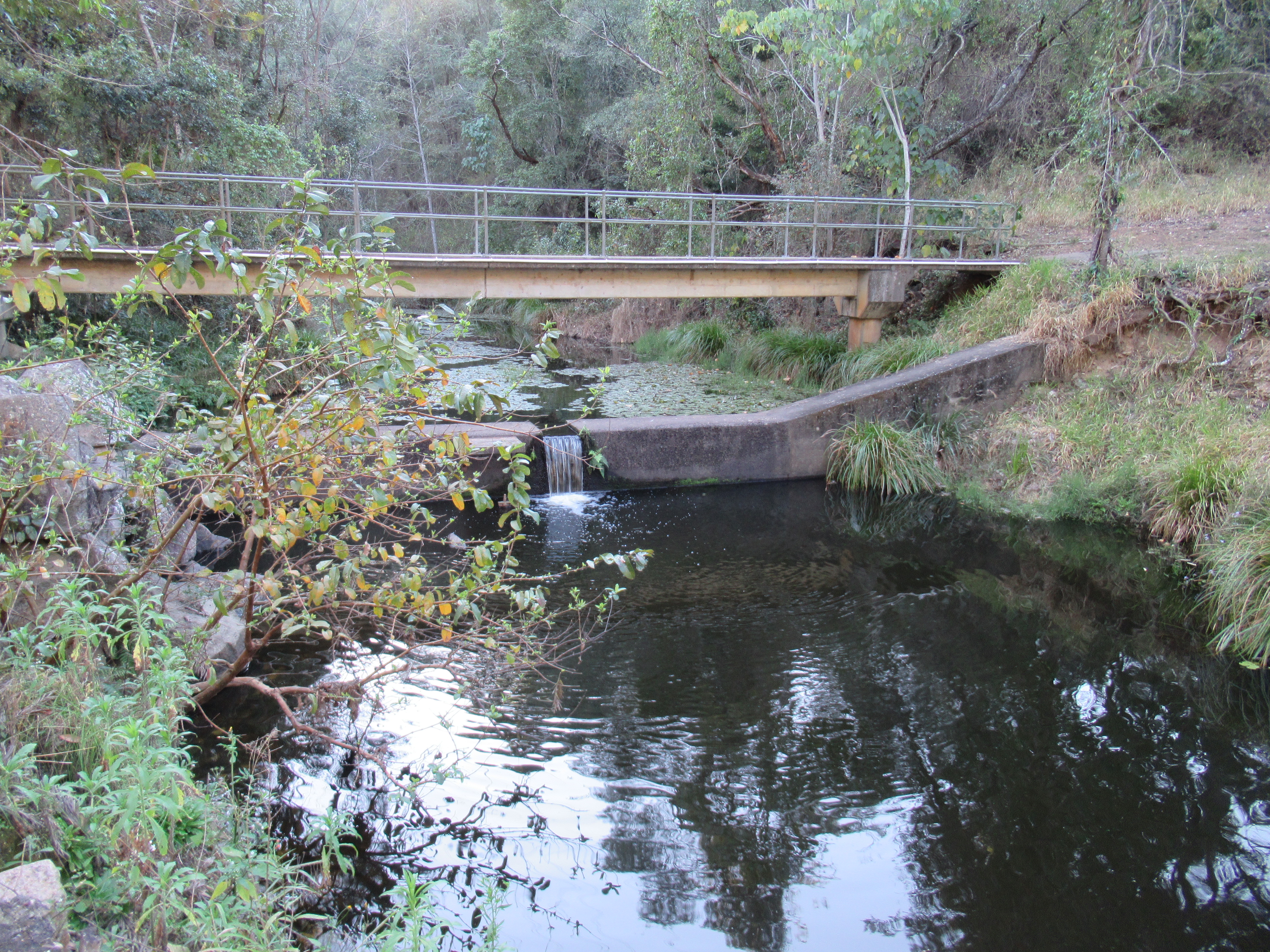
The dam weir

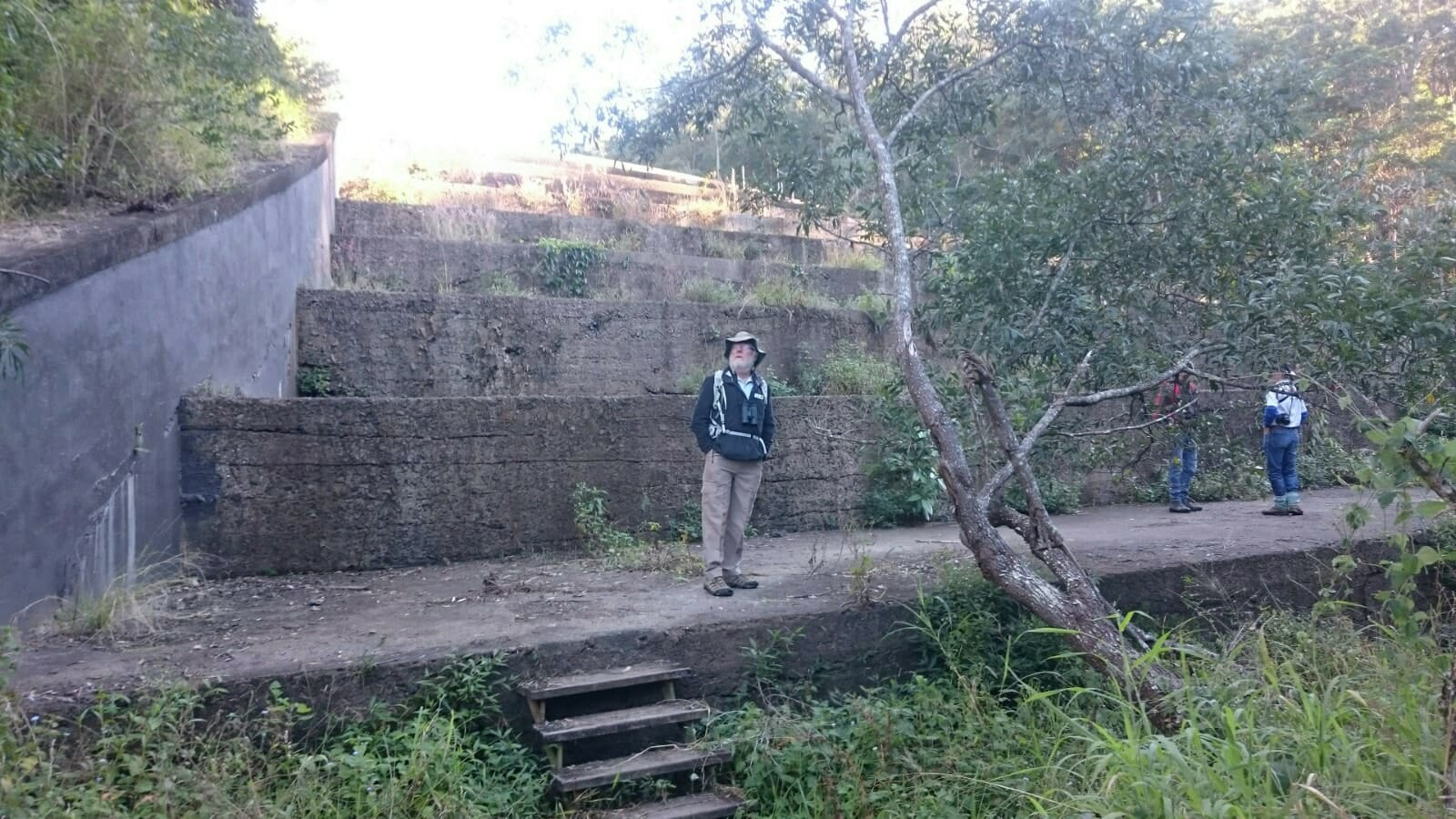
Looking up at the dam stepped spillway

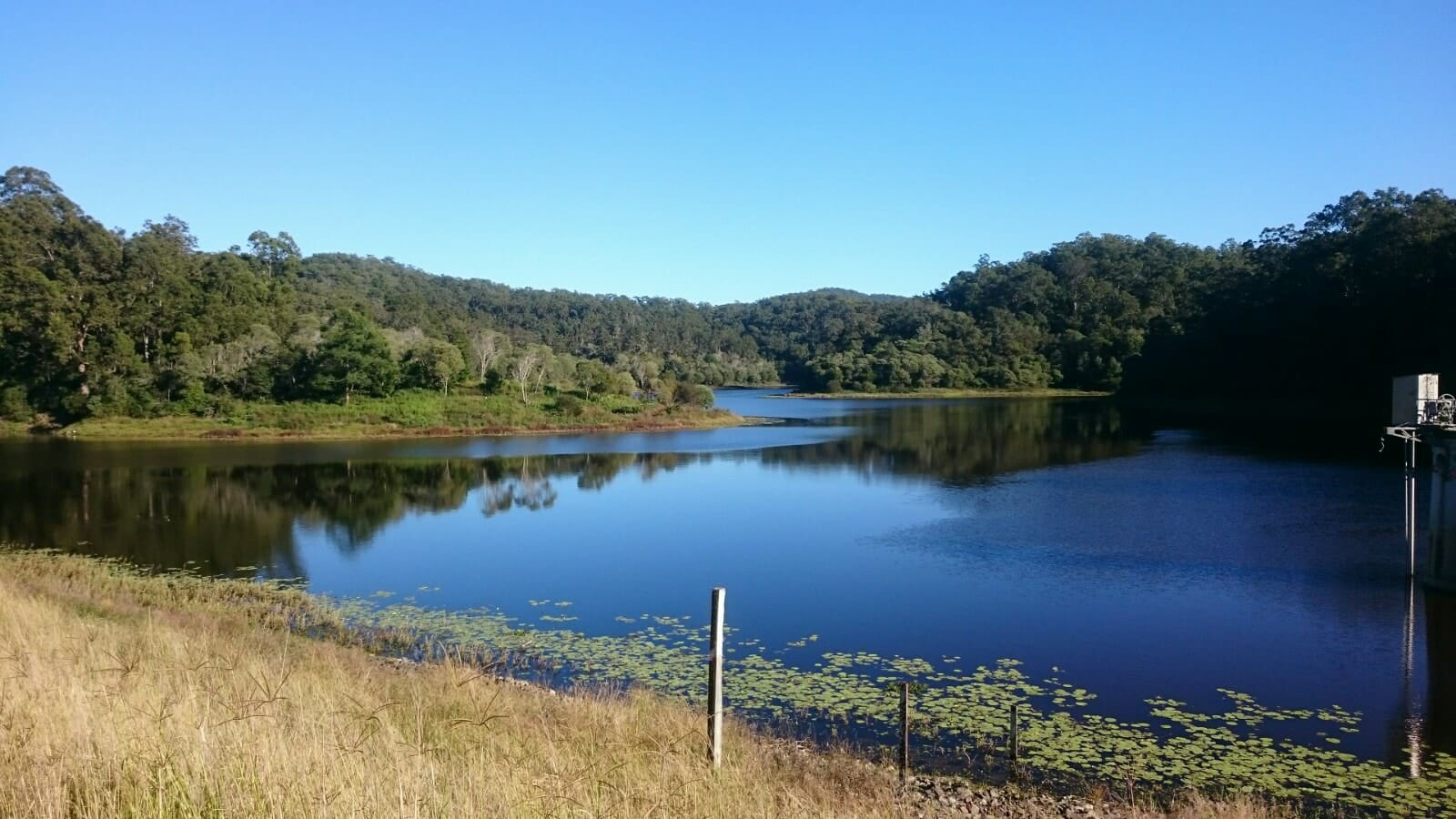
The dam trail view, 2018

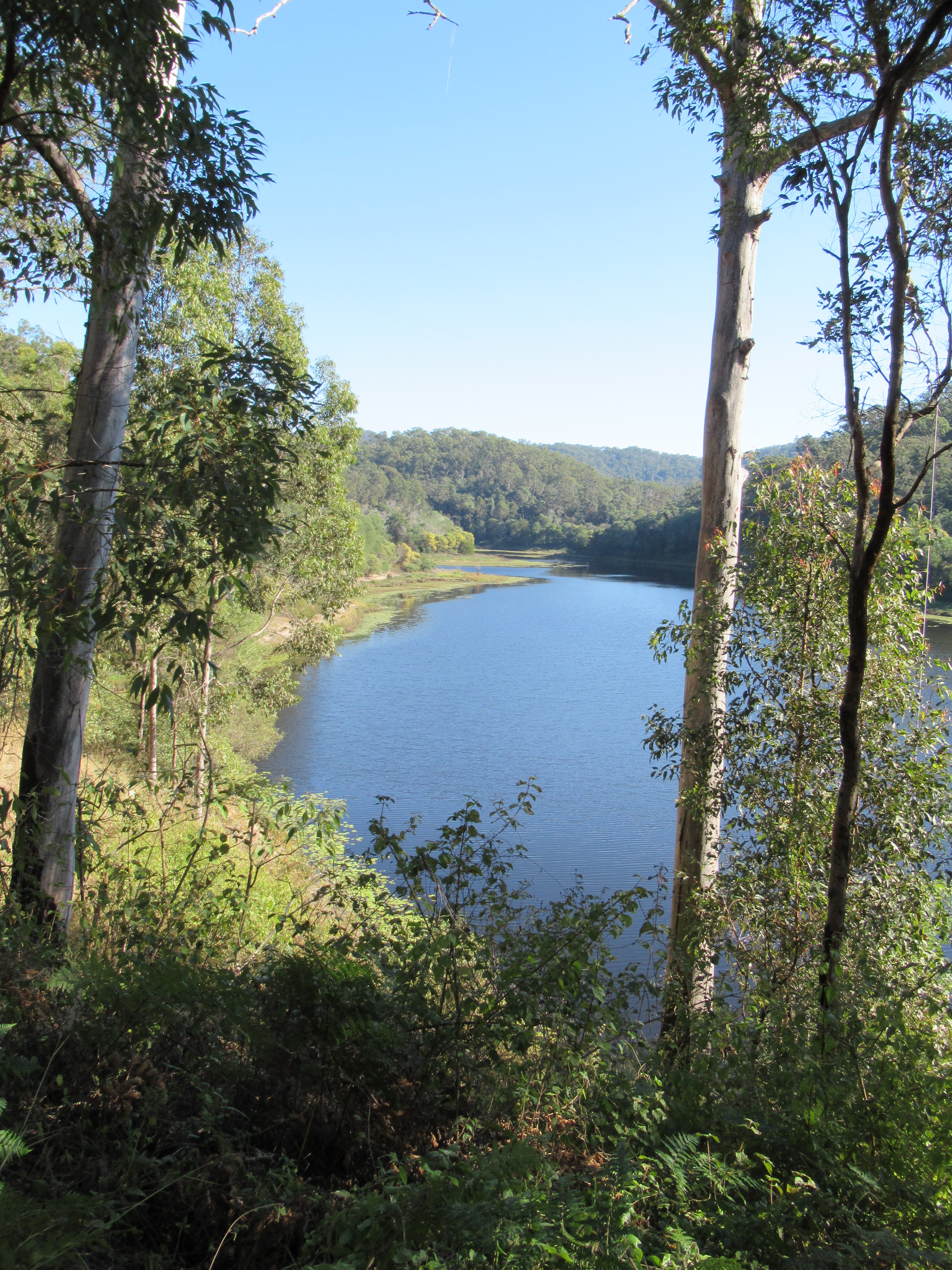
The dam trail view, 2018

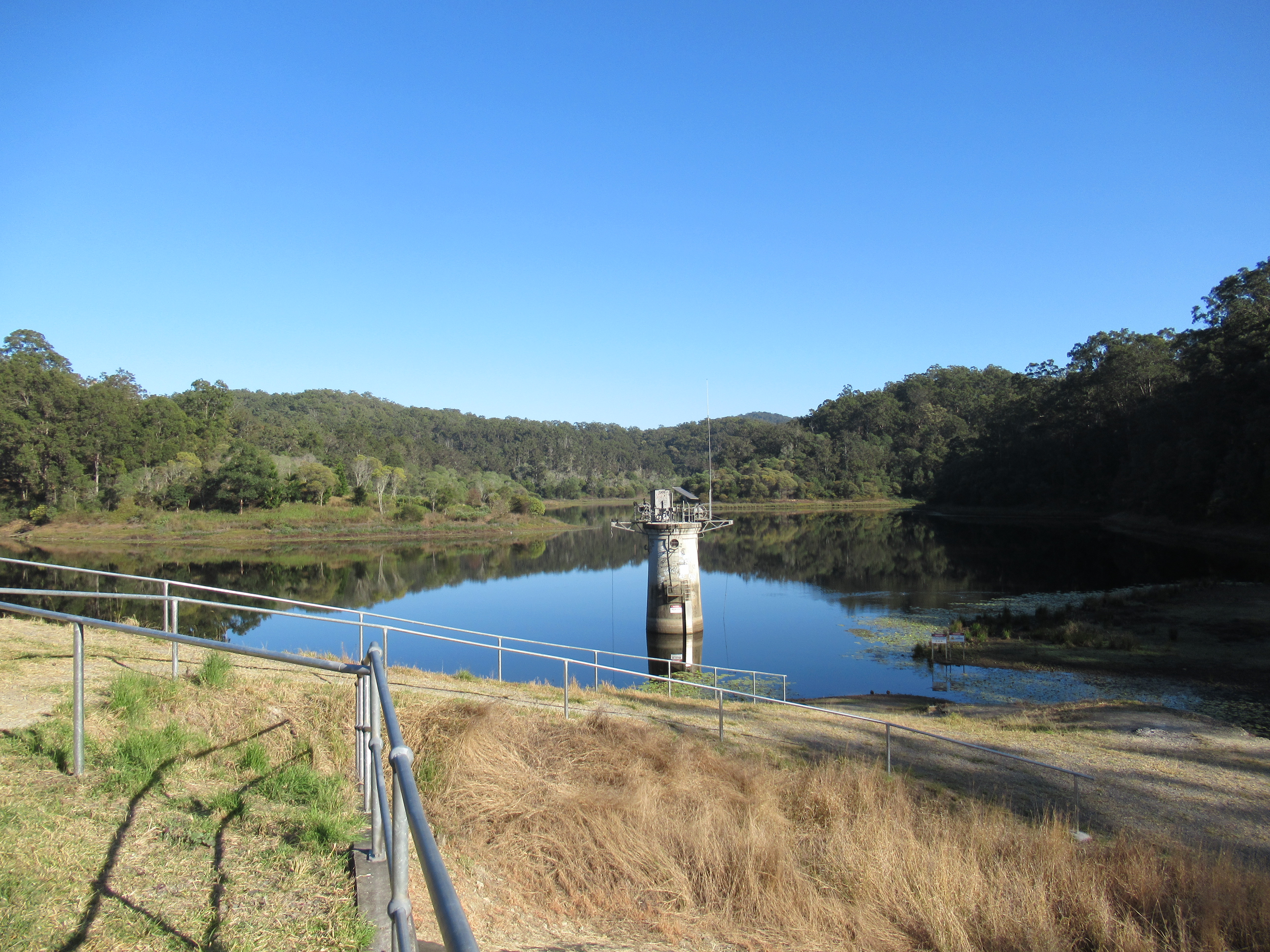
The dam trail view, 2018

== See also ==
- List of dams in Queensland
