= Enoggera Dam =

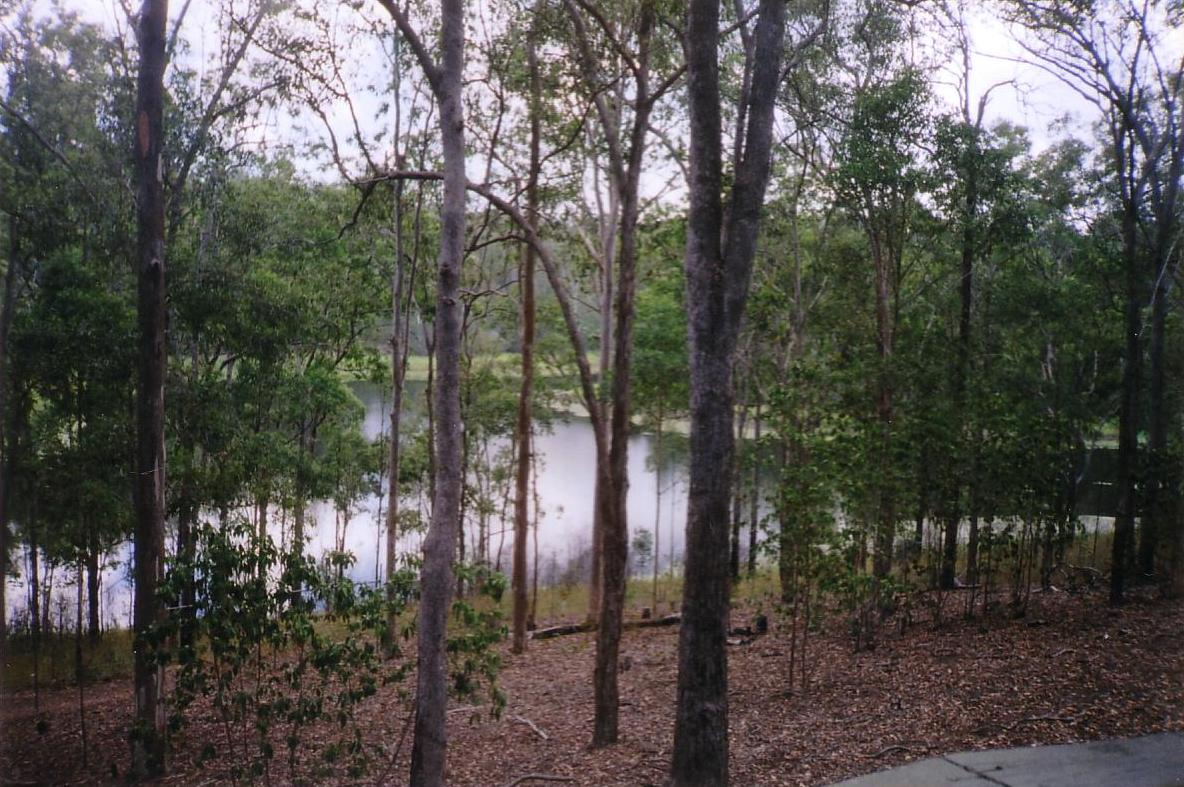
- The dam at the Brisbane Forest Park, 2007

- Location of the dam in Queensland
- Interactive map of Enoggera Dam
- Country: Australia
- Location: South East Queensland
- Coordinates: 27°26′50″S 152°55′37″E
- Purpose: Water supply
- Status: Operational
- Construction began: 1864
- Opening date: 1866
- Construction cost: £71,000
- Built by: Donovan & Hulse; Thiess Bros. (1976)
- Operator: SeqWater

Dam and spillways
- Type of dam: Earth fill dam
- Impounds: Enoggera Creek
- Height: 23.5 m (77 ft)
- Length: 475 m (1,558 ft)
- Dam volume: 360×10^{3} m^{3} (13×10^{6} cu ft)
- Spillway type: Uncontrolled
- Spillway capacity: 450 m^{3}/s (16,000 cu ft/s)

Reservoir
- Creates: Enoggera Reservoir
- Total capacity: 4,567 ML (3,703 acre⋅ft)
- Catchment area: 33 km^{2} (13 sq mi)
- Surface area: 75 ha (190 acres)
- Maximum length: 2,376 m (7,795 ft)
- Maximum width: 640 m (2,100 ft)

Queensland Heritage Register
- Official name: Enoggera Reservoir
- Type: State heritage (utilities)
- Designated: 3 July 2007
- Reference no.: 602458

The Enoggera Dam is a heritage-listed earth-filled embankment dam across the Enoggera Creek, located within the outer, western suburb of Enoggera Reservoir, in Brisbane, Queensland, Australia. Completed in 1866, the resultant reservoir, Enoggera Reservoir, was established for the supply of potable water to the City of Brisbane.

== History ==
The Enoggera Dam was constructed in 1866, on the upper reach of Breakfast Creek (which section was later renamed Enoggera Creek). It was the first major dam built in Queensland and the second major dam built in Australia (the first major dam, Yan Yean Reservoir having been built in Victoria in 1850). It is rare as one of the few remaining examples in Queensland of an intact and functioning reservoir and treatment plant from this period in time. The clay-cored earth-fill dam was designed and built by Joseph Brady.

Water supply problems plagued Brisbane's early years. Soon after the Brisbane Municipal Council was established in 1860, a Water Supply Committee was formed. The earliest reservoir in Brisbane, which was located on the present Law Courts precinct at the intersection of George, Roma and Turbot Streets, suffered from accumulation of dead animals and vegetable matter.

=== Site selection ===
Breakfast Creek was rejected by the Water Supply Committee because it was too close to the town. Thomas Oldham, an engineer who had worked on water supply to Melbourne, was employed to conduct a survey and solve Brisbane's problems.

One of Oldham's site recommendations on the Brisbane River near Dutton Park was dismissed because of its prohibitive costs. The other site Oldham suggested was selected because it was where Enoggera Creek left the range. The Surveyor-General, Augustus Gregory also suggested a site on Ithaca Creek. This location was abandoned because it had a small catchment size.

Enoggera Creek had a large catchment that rose higher in the D'Aguilar Range and had more smaller creeks flowing into it. The location was steep and heavily timbered. It took eighteen months and ten different contractors to just clear the site.

=== Construction ===
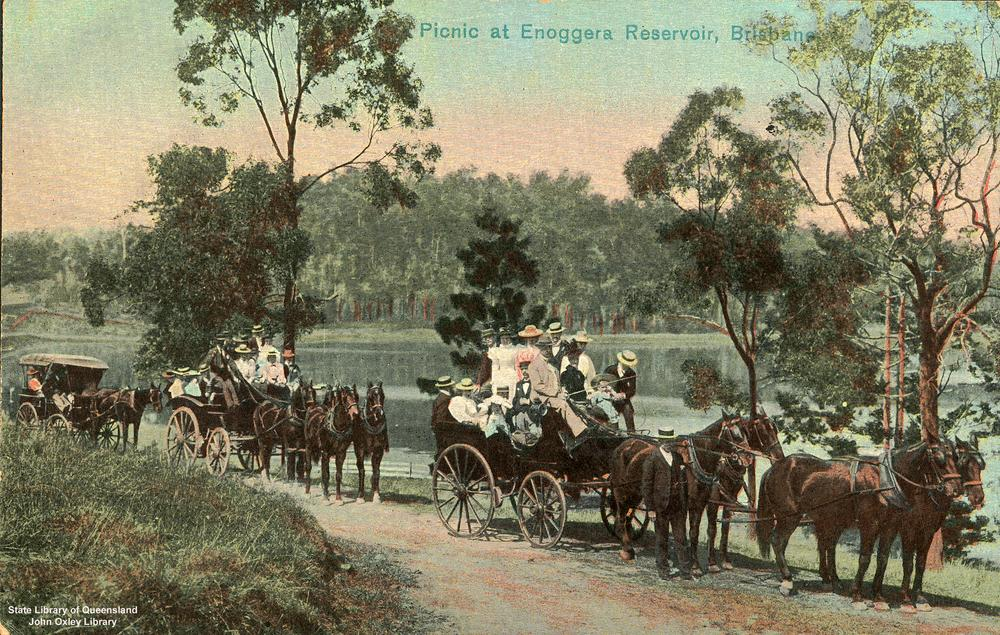
A hand coloured postcard showing picnickers around the turn of the 20th century.

The Queensland Government didn't have confidence in the Council to supervise the dam's construction. After requesting revised plans and detailed cost estimates the Board of Waterworks was established to oversee the project.

Approval for the dam's construction was given in May 1864. Work began in August 1864, with water flowing by July 1866.

A single wrought-iron mains pipe, 8 inches (20 cm) in diameter (in lieu of the 20 inches (51 cm) in diameter originally proposed by Oldham) supplied the town of Brisbane . The pipe arrived at Roma Street, with branch pipes from there to various parts of the town. By 1869 the pipelines were extended to a total of eighteen kilometers, benefiting between five and six thousand people.

Three outlet pipes were incorporated into the design instead of the usual one or two. This allowed the potential supply to increase if needed as well as providing some safety benefits.

The original cost was £50,000, which was raised to £65,000. By the end of 1870 more than £71,000 had been spent and water supply for the rapidly growing city of Brisbane was not being met by strong demand. To solve the problem another dam, Gold Creek Dam was approved in 1881.

A commemorative drinking fountain in the City Botanic Gardens is dedicated to the arrival of clean drinking mains water to Brisbane.

=== Droughts and floods ===
Dry periods pronounced water quality problems in both Enoggera Dam and Gold Creek Dam built after the Enoggera reservoir was completed. The Mount Crosby Weir and pumping station alleviated some concerns but flooding of the Brisbane River was problematic. It was not until 1912 that water from Enoggera Dam was filtered.

A spillway was added in 1976. Seven metres was added to the height of the dam wall for flood mitigation in the same year.

The dam was decommissioned in 2003, then in early 2006 water from Enoggera Dam was again added to inner north-west Brisbane's drinking water supply, when drought had reduced South East Queensland's water supply to critical levels.

During the 2022 eastern Australia floods, Enoggera Dam reached a capacity of 270%, leading to severe flooding in the Enoggera Creek catchment.

== Current use ==
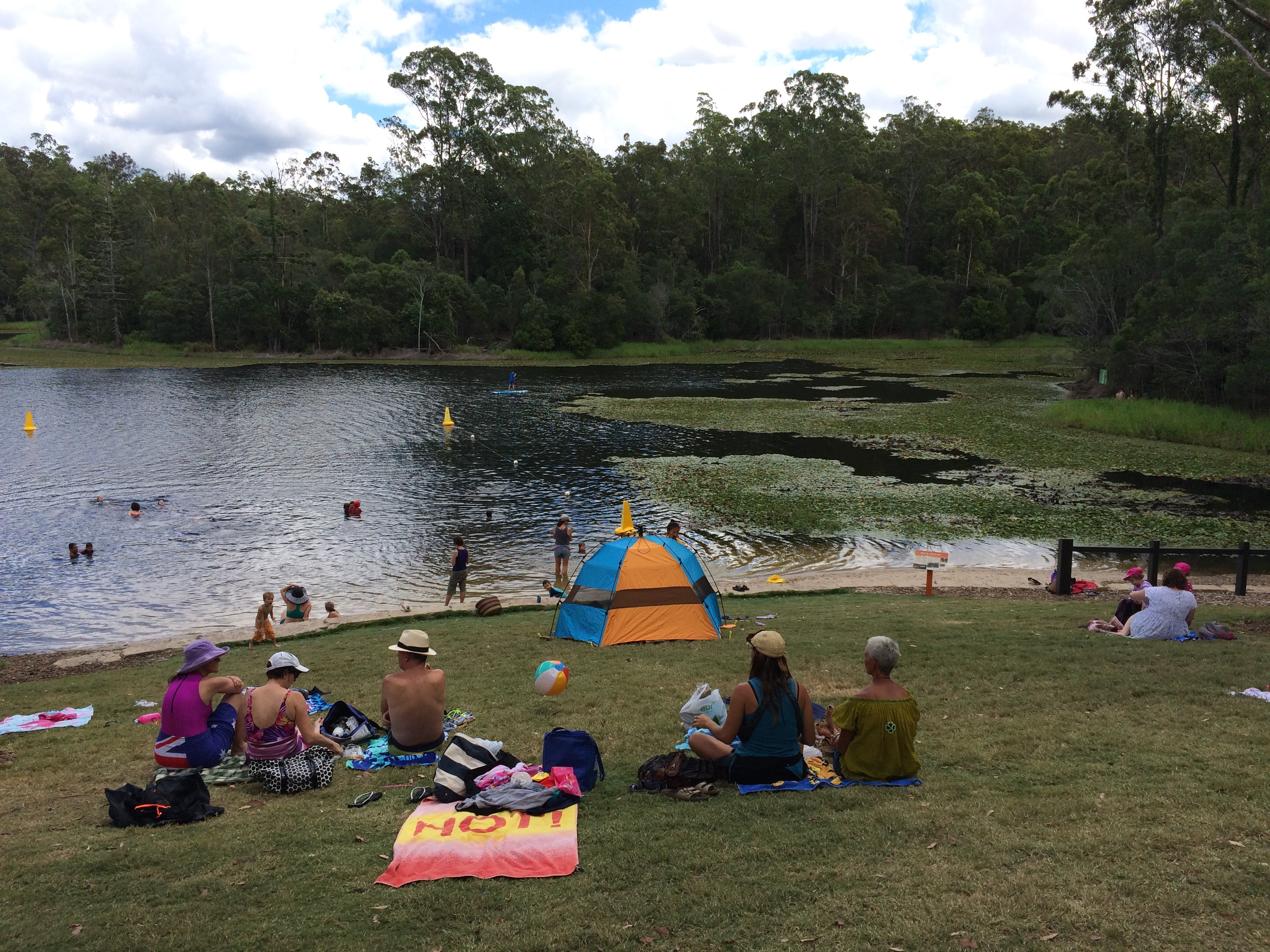
Recreational use of the dam, 2015

The dam was managed by the Brisbane City Council until July 2008, until it was transferred to SeqWater in a region-wide redistribution of water assets. During summer the recreational area is a popular place for local families to escape the heat.

There are walking tracks in the area, and no permit is required. In March 2014, SeqWater released a recreation guide that allowed for water activities including swimming, canoeing, kayaking and fishing with a licence. The public recreational area is divided into areas for wading and for the launching of watercraft. Public access to the dam is via Walkabout Creek Wildlife Centre.

== Heritage listing ==
The dam was listed on the Queensland Heritage Register in 2007.

== Gallery ==
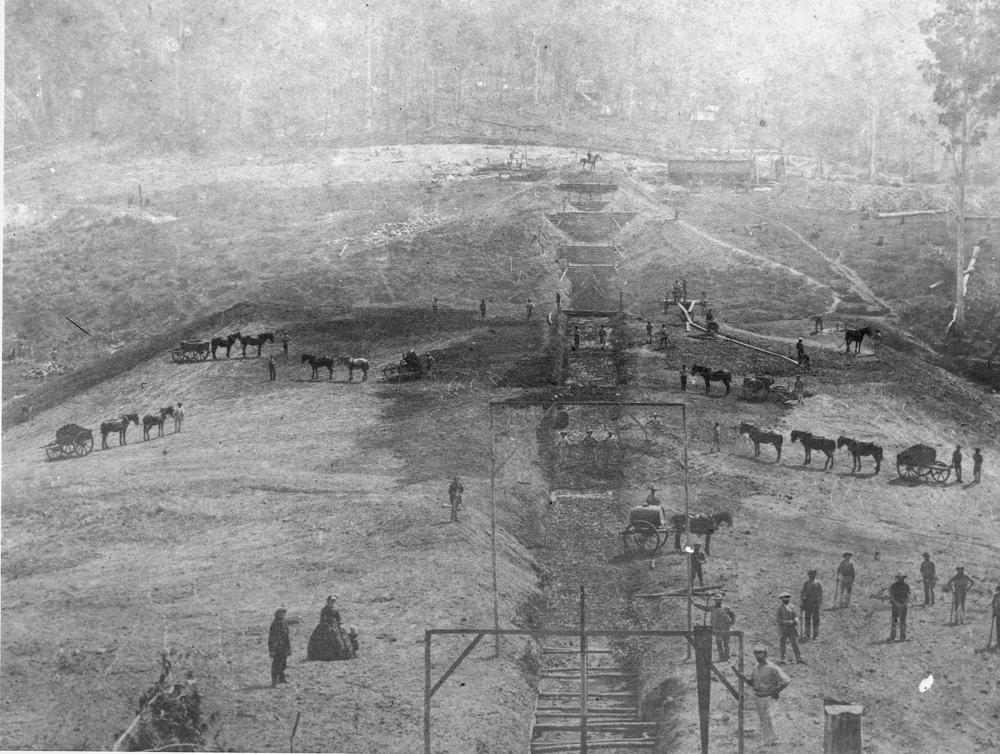
Dam construction, c. 1864

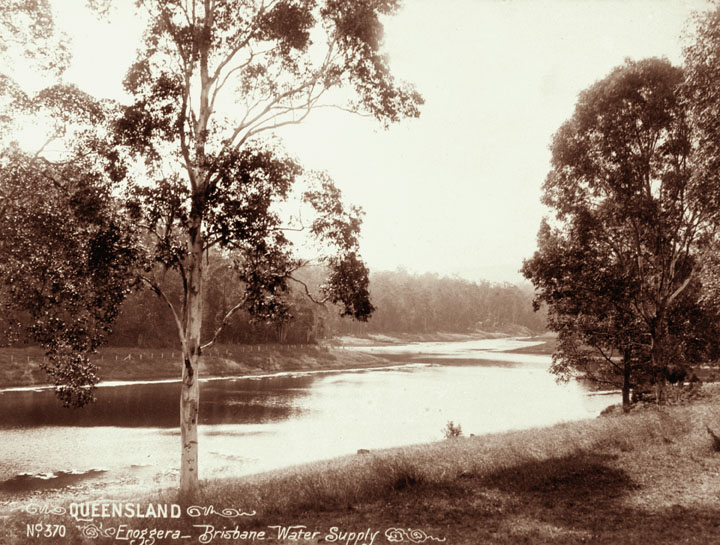
The dam, c. 1897

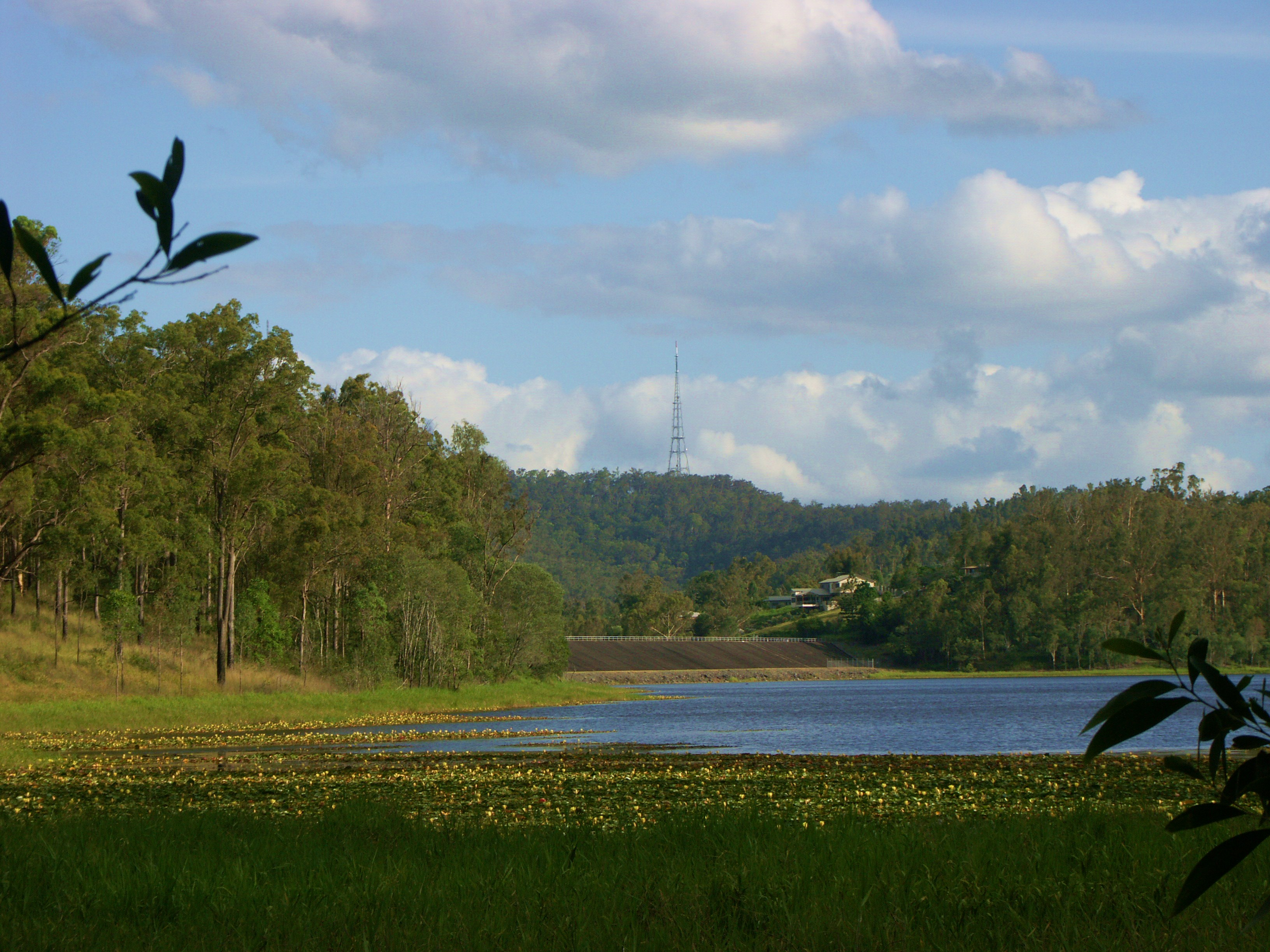
The dam wall, 2010

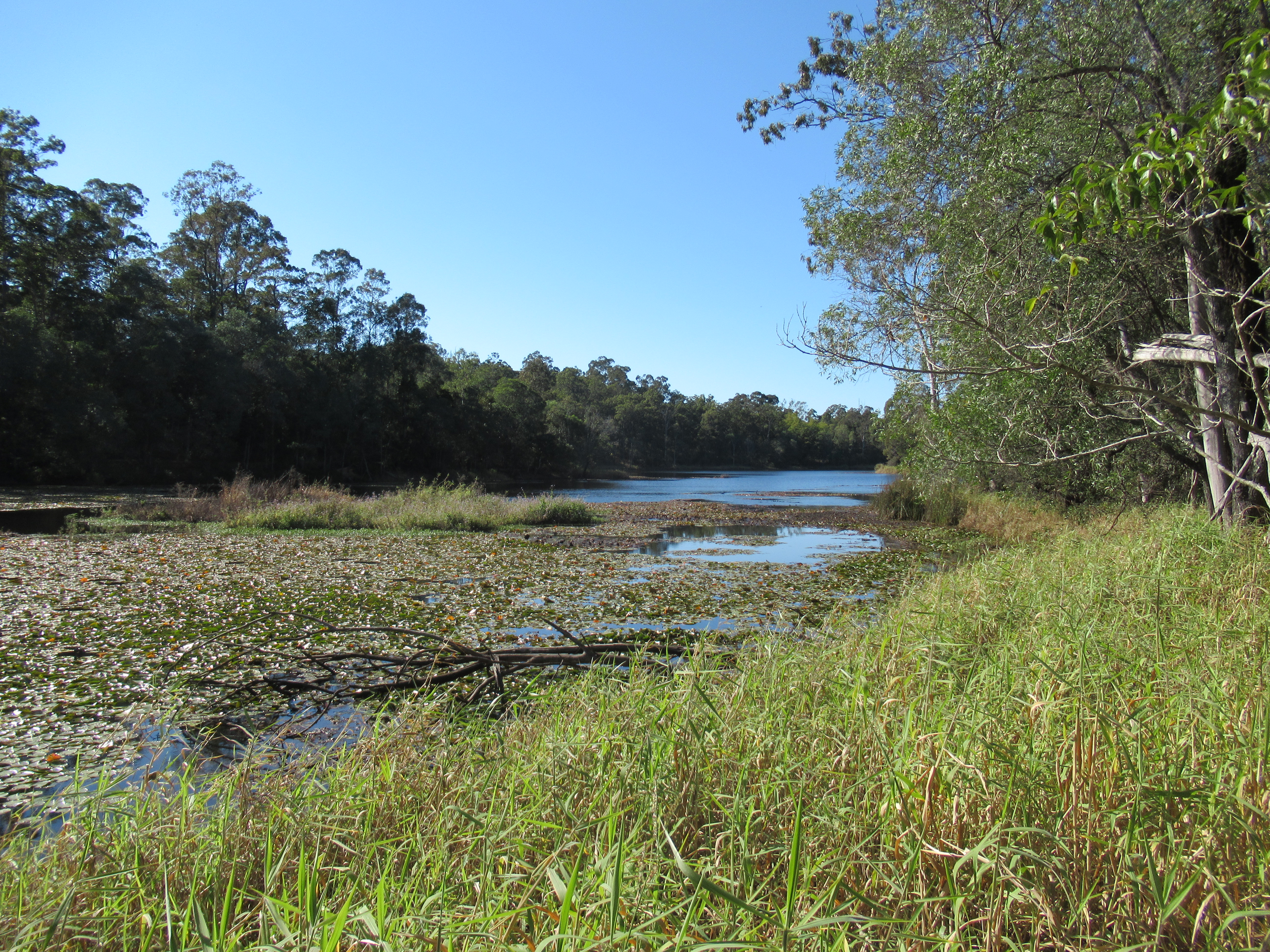
The dam, 2018

== See also ==
- List of dams and reservoirs in Australia
