= Gold Creek (Queensland) =

River in Queensland, Australia

Coordinates: 27°28′38.84″S 152°54′27.5″E

Gold Creek rises in Brisbane Forest Park in the suburb of Upper Brookfield, Brisbane, Queensland, Australia; is dammed by Gold Creek Dam and on leaving the Forest Park runs alongside Gold Creek Road until it joins Gap Creek at Brookfield.
