= Spillway =

Structure for controlled release of flows from a dam or levee

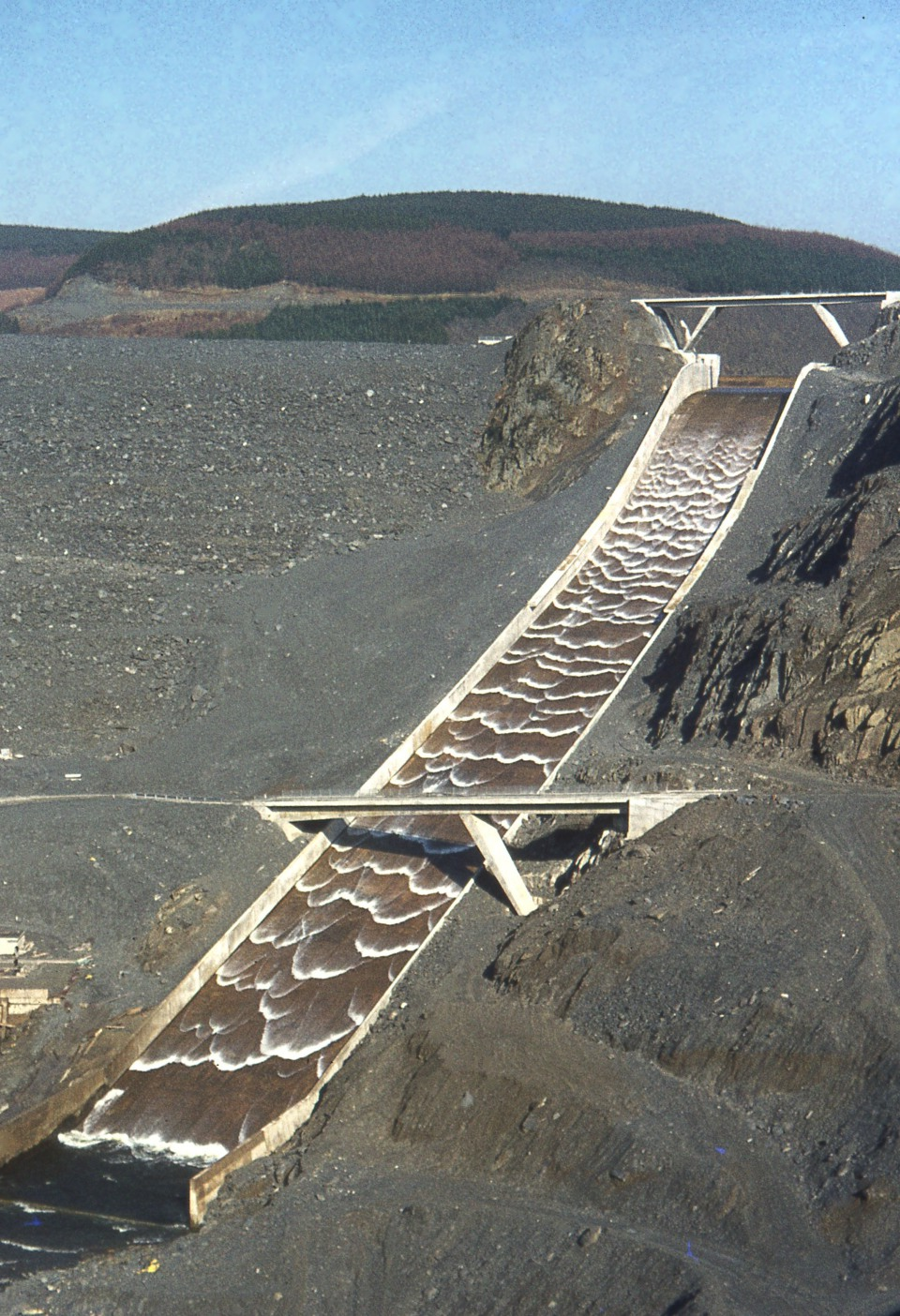
Chute spillway of Llyn Brianne dam in Wales

A spillway is a structure used to provide the controlled release of water from a dam or levee, typically downstream into the dammed river. In the United Kingdom, it may be known as an overflow channel. A spillway ensures that water does not damage parts of the structure not designed to convey water.

Spillways can include floodgates and fuse plugs to regulate water flow and reservoir level. Such features enable a spillway to regulate downstream flow, allowing dam operators to release water in a controlled manner before the reservoir is full, thereby preventing an unacceptably large release later.

Other uses of the term "spillway" include bypasses of dams and outlets of channels used during high water, and outlet channels carved through natural dams such as moraines.

Water normally flows over a spillway only during flood periods, when the reservoir has reached its capacity and water continues entering faster than it can be released through penstocks or intake towers used to control water release on a routine basis for purposes such as water supply for irrigation and hydroelectricity generation.

== Types ==
A spillway is located near the top of the reservoir pool. Dams may also have bottom outlets with valves or gates which may be operated to release flood flow, and a few dams lack overflow spillways and rely entirely on bottom outlets.

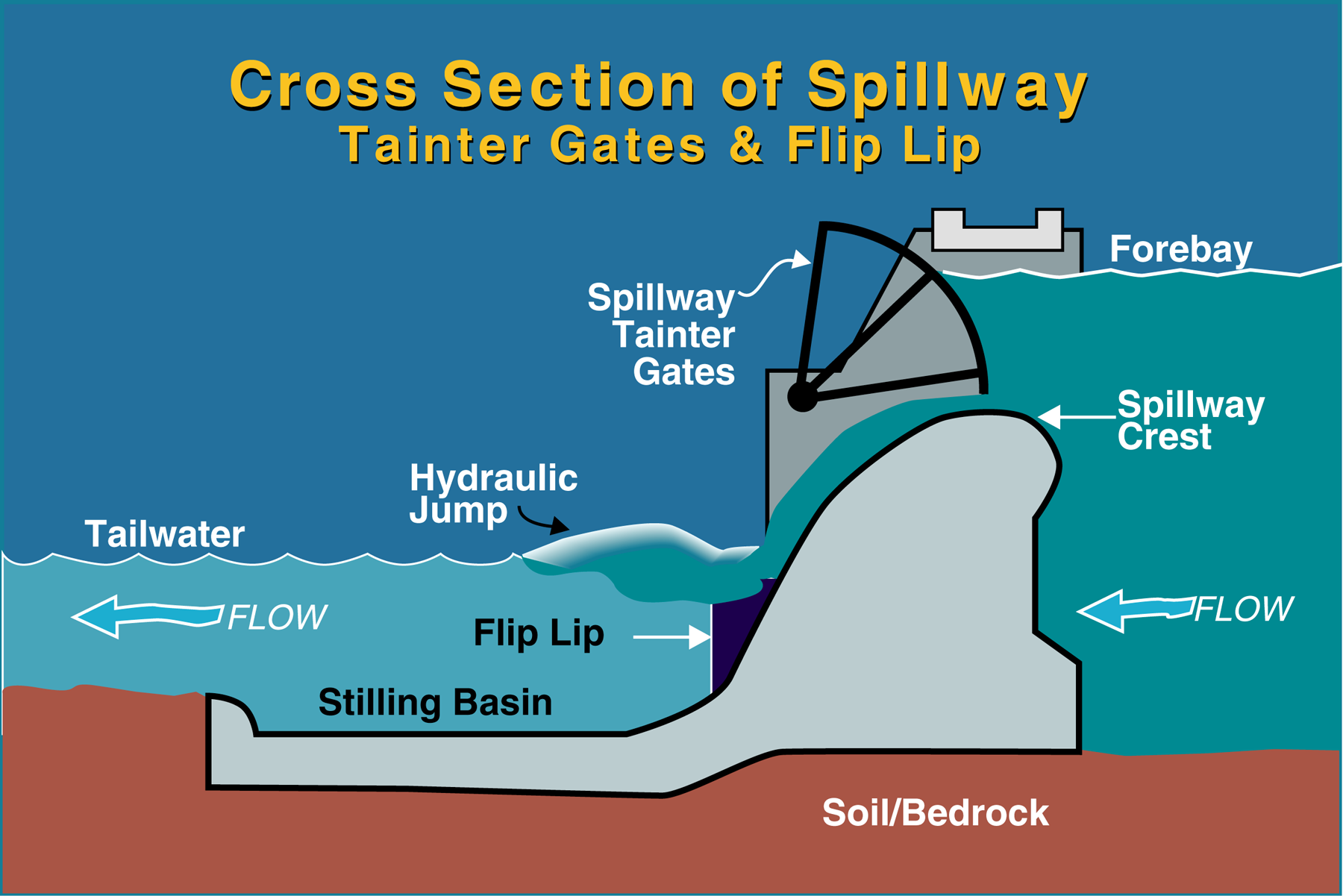
Cross-section of typical spillway with Tainter gates

The two main types of spillways are controlled and uncontrolled.

A controlled spillway has mechanical structures or gates to regulate the rate of flow. This design allows nearly the full height of the dam to be used for water storage year-round, and flood waters can be released as required by opening one or more gates.

An uncontrolled spillway, in contrast, does not have gates; when the water rises above the lip or crest of the spillway, it begins to be released from the reservoir. The rate of discharge is controlled only by the height of water above the reservoir's spillway. The fraction of storage volume in the reservoir above the spillway crest can only be used for the temporary storage of floodwater; it cannot be used as water supply storage because it sits higher than the dam can retain it.

In an intermediate type, normal level regulation of the reservoir is controlled by the mechanical gates. In this case, the dam is not designed to function with water flowing over the top if it, either due to the materials used for its construction or conditions directly downstream. If inflow to the reservoir exceeds the gate's capacity, an artificial channel called an auxiliary or emergency spillway will convey water. Often, that is intentionally blocked by a fuse plug. If present, the fuse plug is designed to wash out in case of a large flood greater than the discharge capacity of the spillway gates. Although many months may be needed for construction crews to restore the fuse plug and channel after such an operation, the total damage and cost to repair is less than if the main water-retaining structures had been overtopped. The fuse plug concept is used where building a spillway with the required capacity would be costly.

=== Open channel spillway ===
==== Chute spillway ====
A chute spillway is a common and basic design that transfers excess water from behind the dam down a smooth decline into the river below. These are usually designed following an ogee curve. Most often, they are lined on the bottom and sides with concrete to protect the dam and topography. They may have a controlling device and some are thinner and multiply-lined if space and funding are tight. In addition, they are not always intended to dissipate energy like stepped spillways. Chute spillways can be ingrained with a baffle of concrete blocks but usually have a "flip lip" and/or dissipator basin, which creates a hydraulic jump, protecting the toe of the dam from erosion.

==== Stepped spillway ====
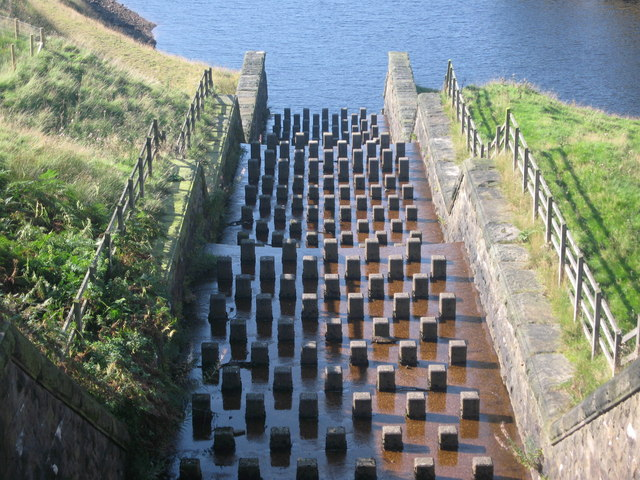
A stepped-chute baffled spillway of the Yeoman Hey Reservoir in the Peak District in England

Stepped channels and spillways have been used for over 3,000 years. Despite being superseded by more modern engineering techniques such as hydraulic jumps in the mid twentieth century, since around 1985 interest in stepped spillways and chutes has been renewed, partly due to the use of new construction materials (e.g. roller-compacted concrete, gabions) and design techniques (e.g. embankment overtopping protection). The steps produce considerable energy dissipation along the chute and reduce the size of the required downstream energy dissipation basin.

Research is still active on the topic, with newer developments on embankment dam overflow protection systems, converging spillways and small-weir design.

=== Bell-mouth spillway ===
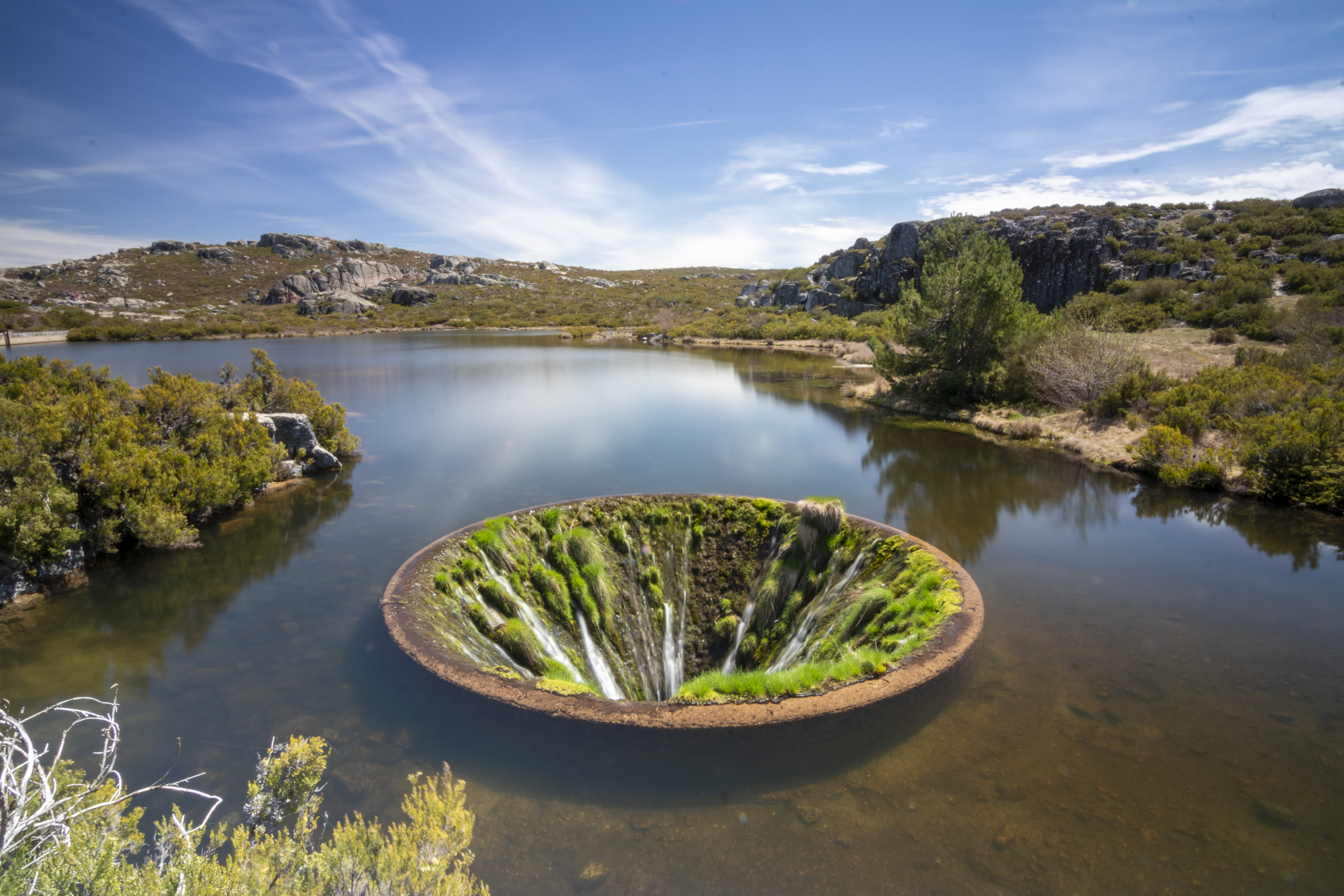
Vegetation has grown in the bell-mouth spillway at Covão dos Conchos, Portugal, since its construction in 1955 such that it resembles a natural formation

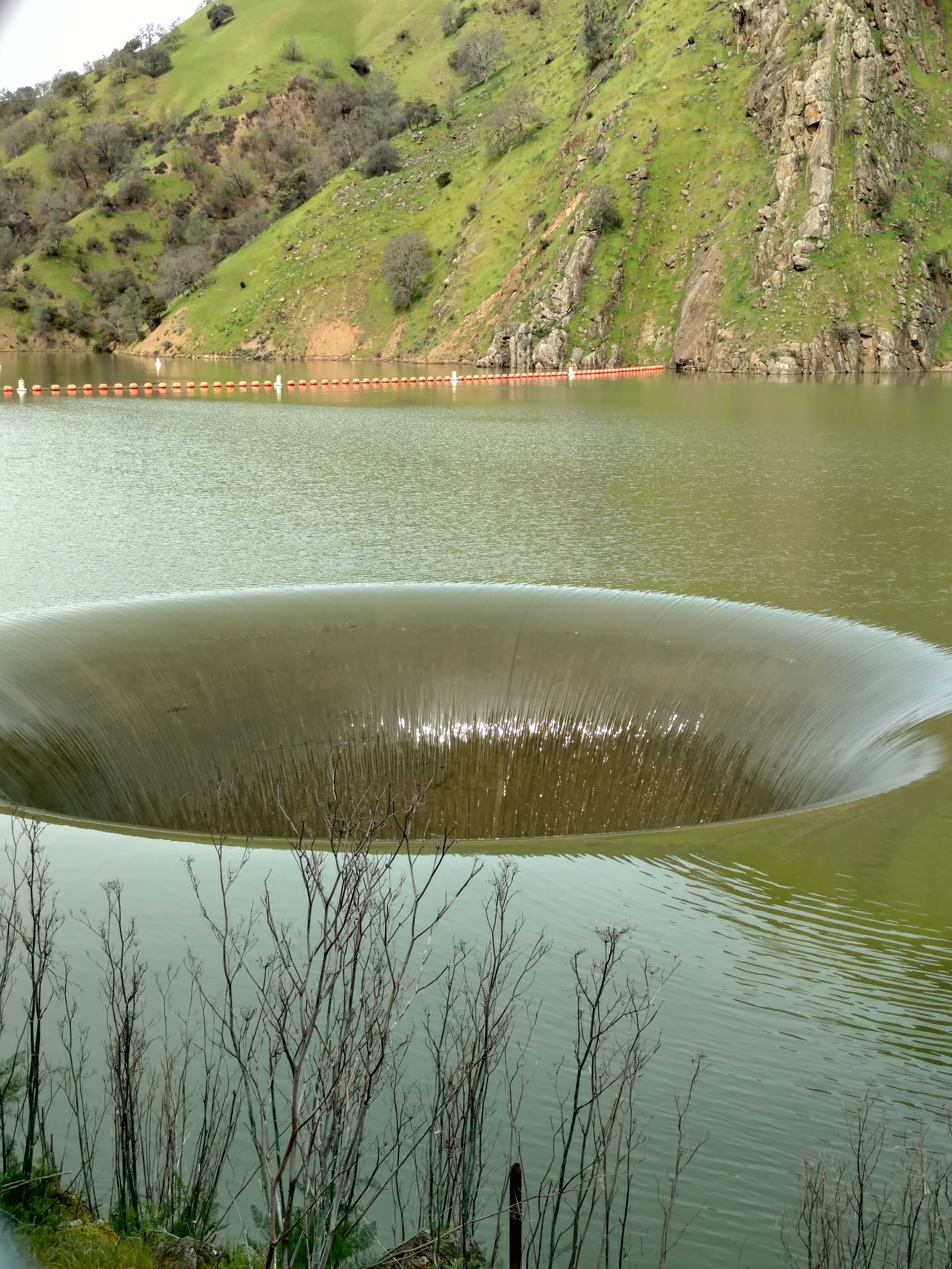
Glory hole spillway in Lake Berryessa, California, in March 2017

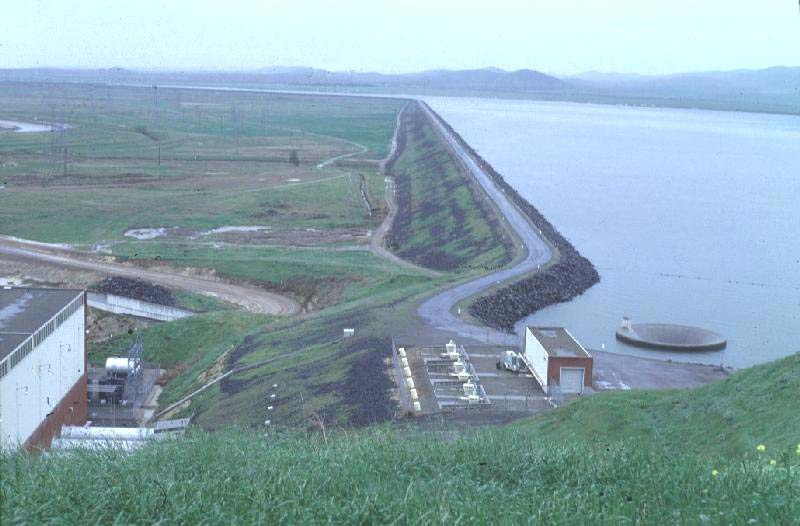
Glory hole spillway of the O'Neill Forebay of the San Luis Reservoir, near Los Banos, California

A bell-mouth spillway is designed like an inverted bell, where water can enter around the entire perimeter. These uncontrolled spillways are also called morning glory (after the flower), glory hole, or shaft spillways. In areas where the surface of the reservoir may freeze, this type of spillway is normally fitted with ice-breaking arrangements to prevent the spillway from becoming ice-bound.

Some bell-mouth spillways are gate-controlled. The highest morning glory spillway in the world is at Hungry Horse Dam in Montana, U.S., and is controlled by a 64-by-12-foot (19.5 by 3.7 m) ring gate. The largest bell-mouth spillway is in Geehi Dam, in New South Wales, Australia, measuring 105 ft (32 m) in diameter at the lake's surface.

=== Siphon spillway ===
A siphon spillway uses the difference in height between the intake and the outlet to create the pressure difference required to remove excess water. Siphons require priming to remove air in the bend for them to function, and most siphon spillways are designed to use water to automatically prime the siphon. One such design is the volute siphon, which employs volutes, or fins, on a funnel to form water into a vortex that draws air out of the system. The priming happens automatically when the water level rises above the inlets.

=== Other types ===
The ogee crest over-tops a dam, a side channel wraps around the topography of a dam, and a labyrinth uses a zig-zag design to increase the sill length for a thinner design and increased discharge. A drop inlet resembles an intake for a hydroelectric power plant and transfers water from behind the dam directly through tunnels to the river downstream.

== Design considerations ==
One parameter of spillway design is the largest flood it is designed to handle. The structures must safely withstand the appropriate spillway design flood (SDF), sometimes called the inflow design flood (IDF). The magnitude of the SDF may be set by dam safety guidelines, based on the size of the structure and the potential loss of human life or property downstream. The magnitude of the flood is sometimes expressed as a return period. A 100-year recurrence interval is the flood magnitude expected to be exceeded on the average of once in 100 years. This parameter may be expressed as an exceedance frequency with a 1% chance of being exceeded in any given year. The volume of water expected during the design flood is obtained by hydrologic calculations of the upstream watershed. The return period is set by dam safety guidelines, based on the size of the structure and the potential loss of human life or property downstream.

The United States Army Corps of Engineers bases their requirements on the probable maximum flood (PMF) and the probable maximum precipitation (PMP). The PMP is the largest precipitation thought to be physically possible in the upstream watershed. Dams of lower hazard may be allowed to have an IDF less than the PMF.

=== Energy dissipation ===
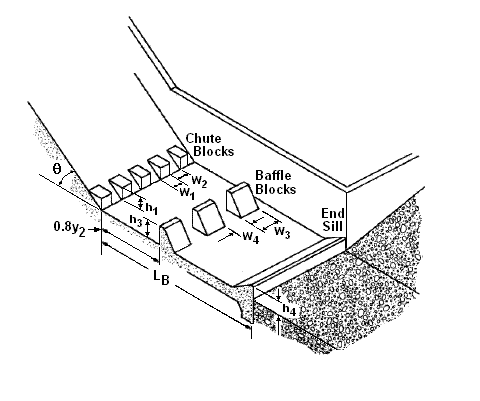
A U.S. Bureau of Reclamation type-III stilling basin

As water passes over a spillway and down the chute, potential energy converts into increasing kinetic energy. Failure to dissipate the water's energy can lead to scouring and erosion at the dam's toe (base). This can cause spillway damage and undermine the dam's stability. To put this energy in perspective, the spillways at Tarbela Dam could, at full capacity, produce 40,000 MW; about 10 times the capacity of its power plant.

The energy can be dissipated by addressing one or more parts of a spillway's design.

Steps
First, on the spillway surface itself by a series of steps along the spillway (see stepped spillway).
Flip bucket
Second, at the base of a spillway, a flip bucket can create a hydraulic jump and deflect water upwards.
Ski jump
A ski jump can direct water horizontally and eventually down into a plunge pool, or two ski jumps can direct their water discharges to collide with one another.
Stilling basin
Third, a stilling basin at the terminus of a spillway serves to further dissipate energy and prevent erosion. They are usually filled with a relatively shallow depth of water and sometimes lined with concrete. A number of velocity-reducing components can be incorporated into their design to include chute blocks, baffle blocks, wing walls, surface boils, or end sills.

== Safety ==
Spillway gates may operate suddenly without warning, under remote control. Trespassers within the spillway are at high risk of drowning. Spillways are usually fenced and equipped with locked gates to prevent casual trespassing within the structure. Warning signs, sirens, and other measures may be in place to warn users of the downstream area of sudden release of water. Operating protocols may require "cracking" a gate to release a small amount of water to warn persons downstream.

The sudden closure of a spillway gate can result in the stranding of fish, and this is usually avoided.

== Gallery ==
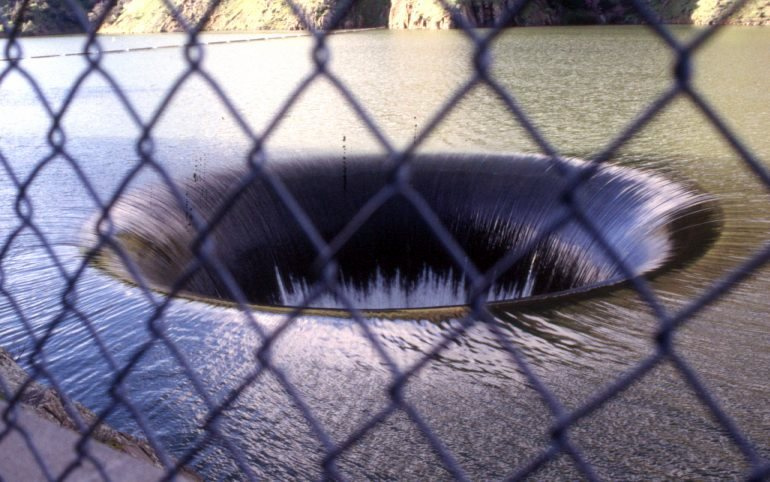
Lake Berryessa overflowing into the glory hole spillway at Monticello Dam

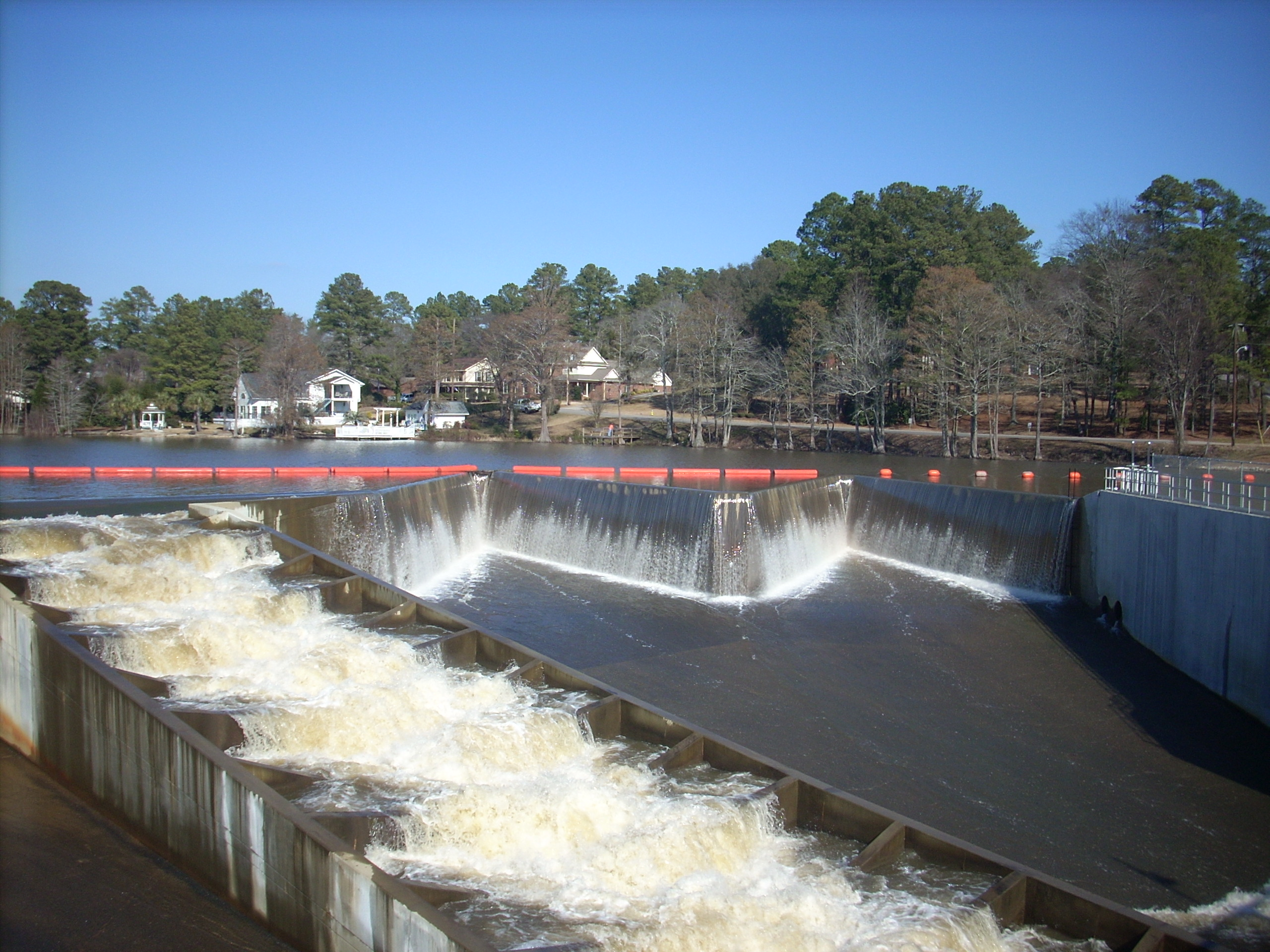
A labyrinth spillway and a fish ladder (left) of the Hope Mills Dam in North Carolina

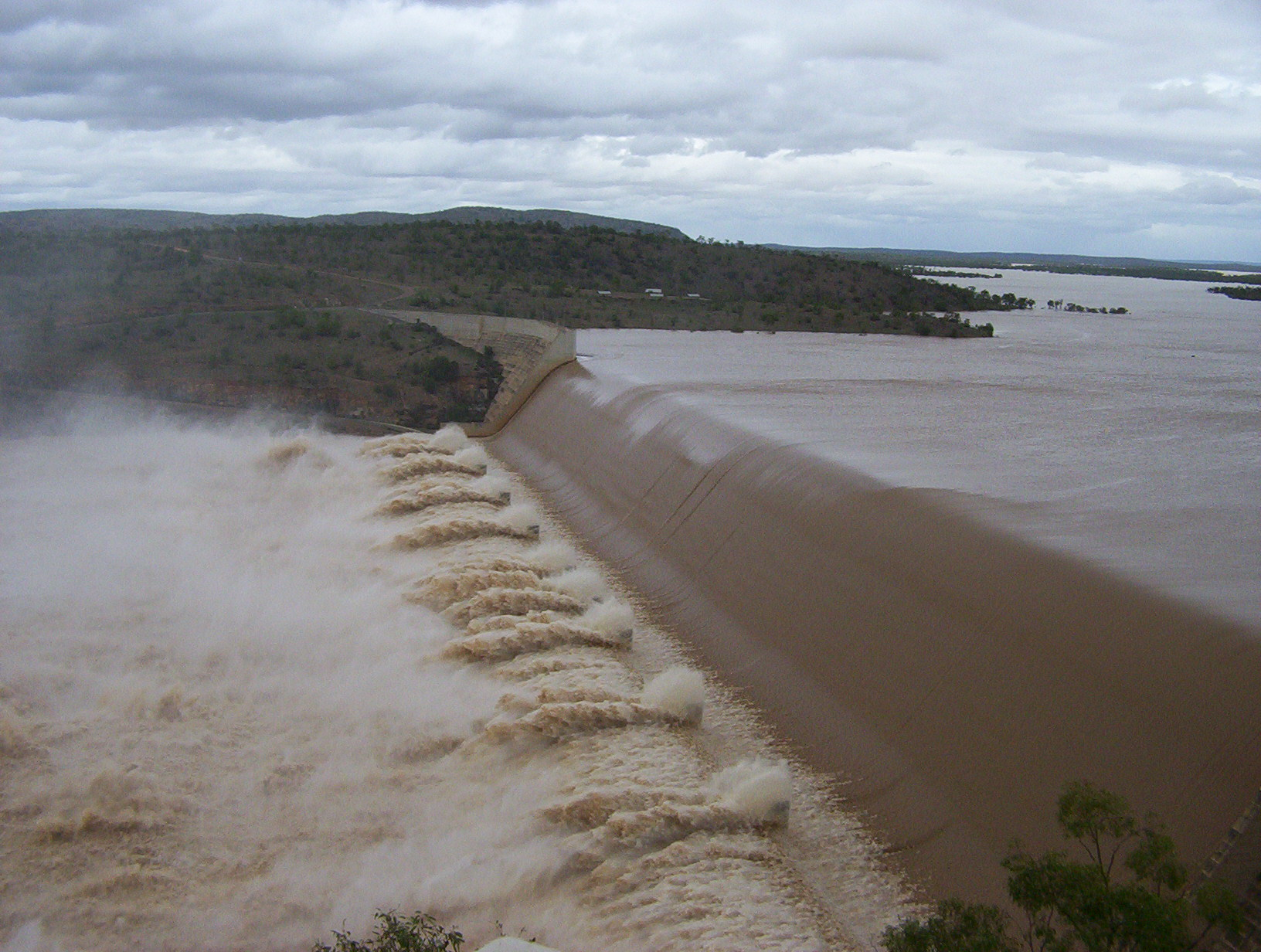
Spillway with flip bucket at Burdekin Dam

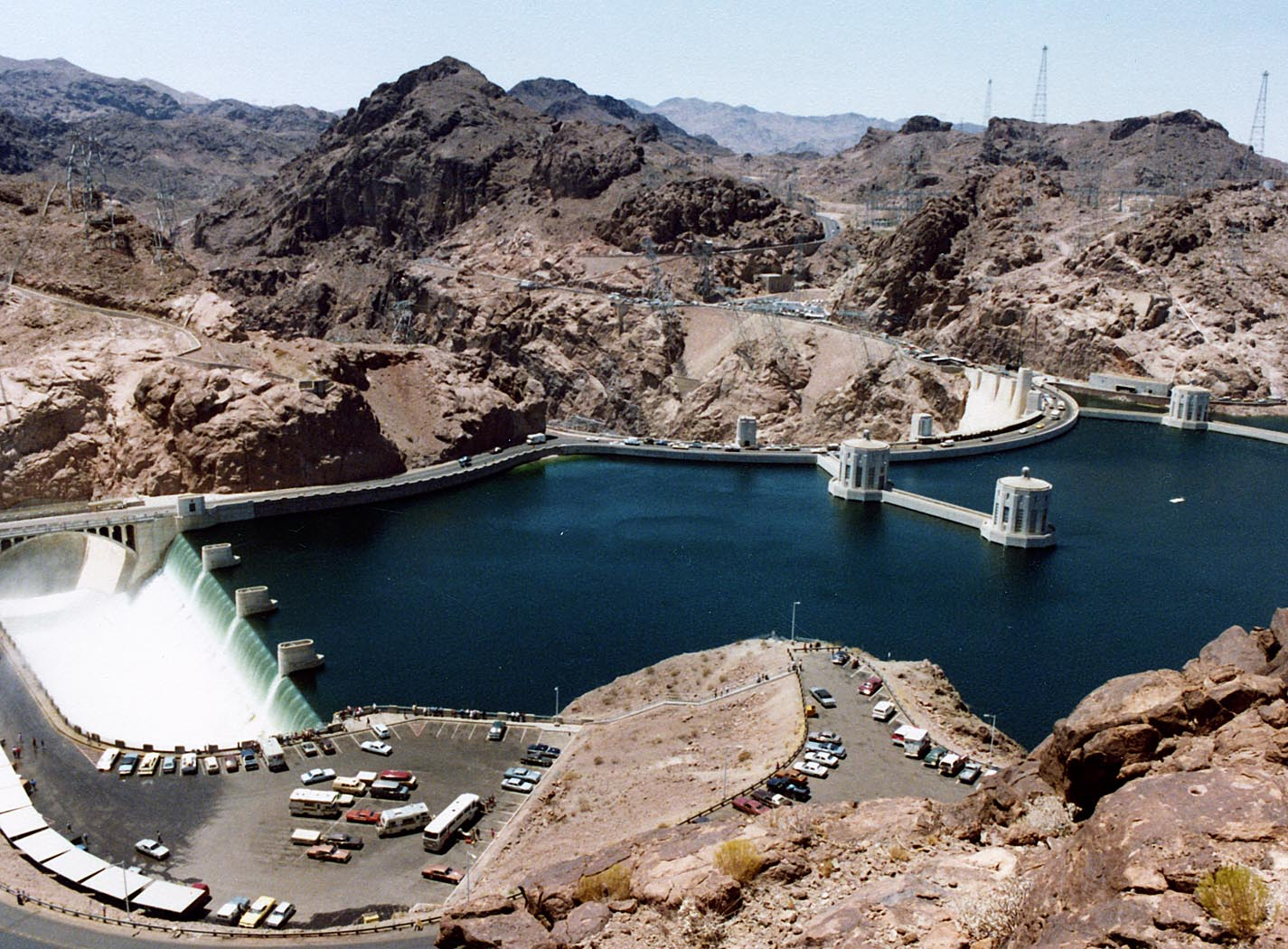
Water enters Hoover Dam's Arizona side channel drum-gate spillway (left) during the 1983 floods

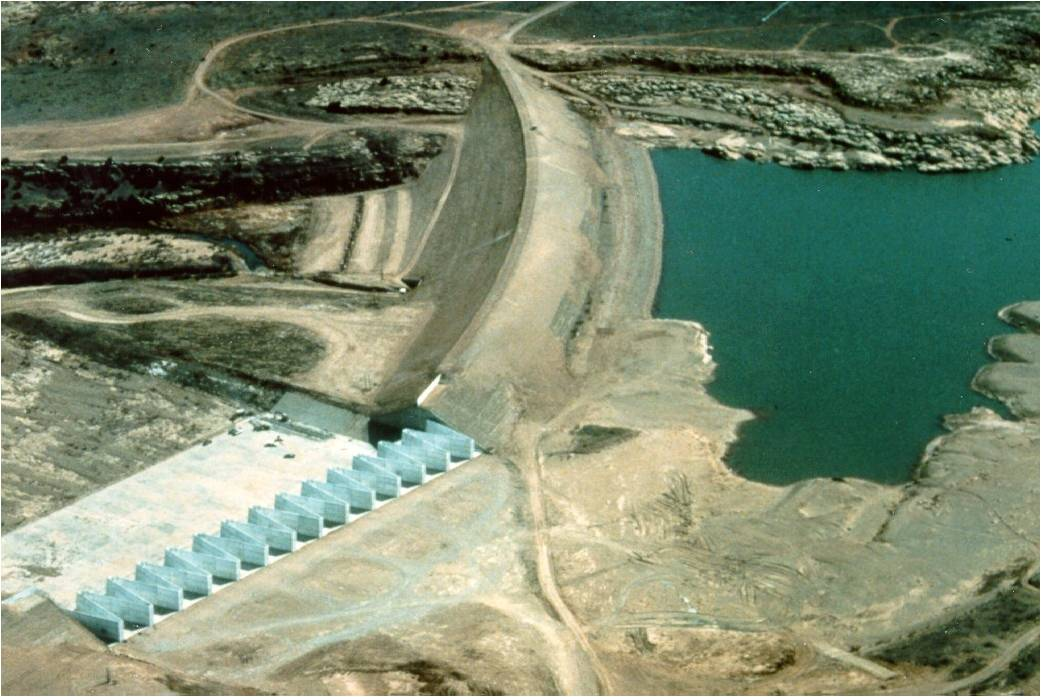
A labyrinth spillway entrance (bottom) at the Ute Dam in New Mexico

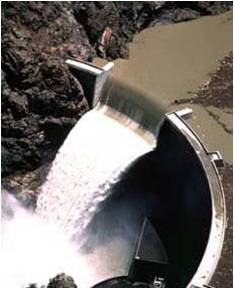
An ogee-type spillway at the Crystal Dam in Colorado

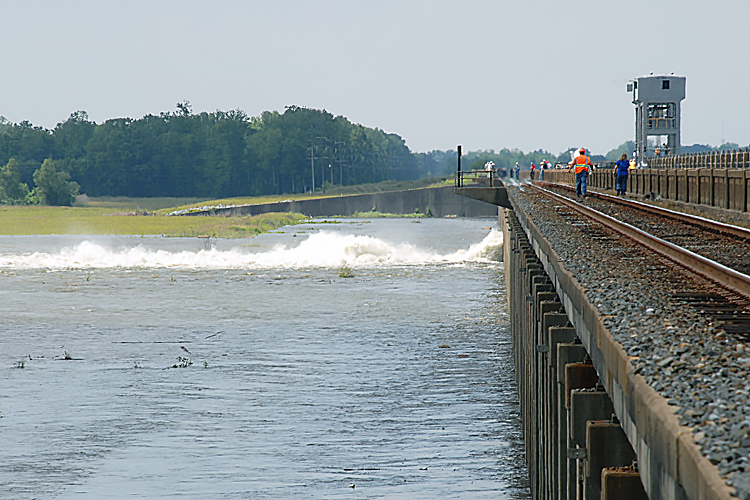
Morganza Spillway opened during the 2011 Mississippi River floods

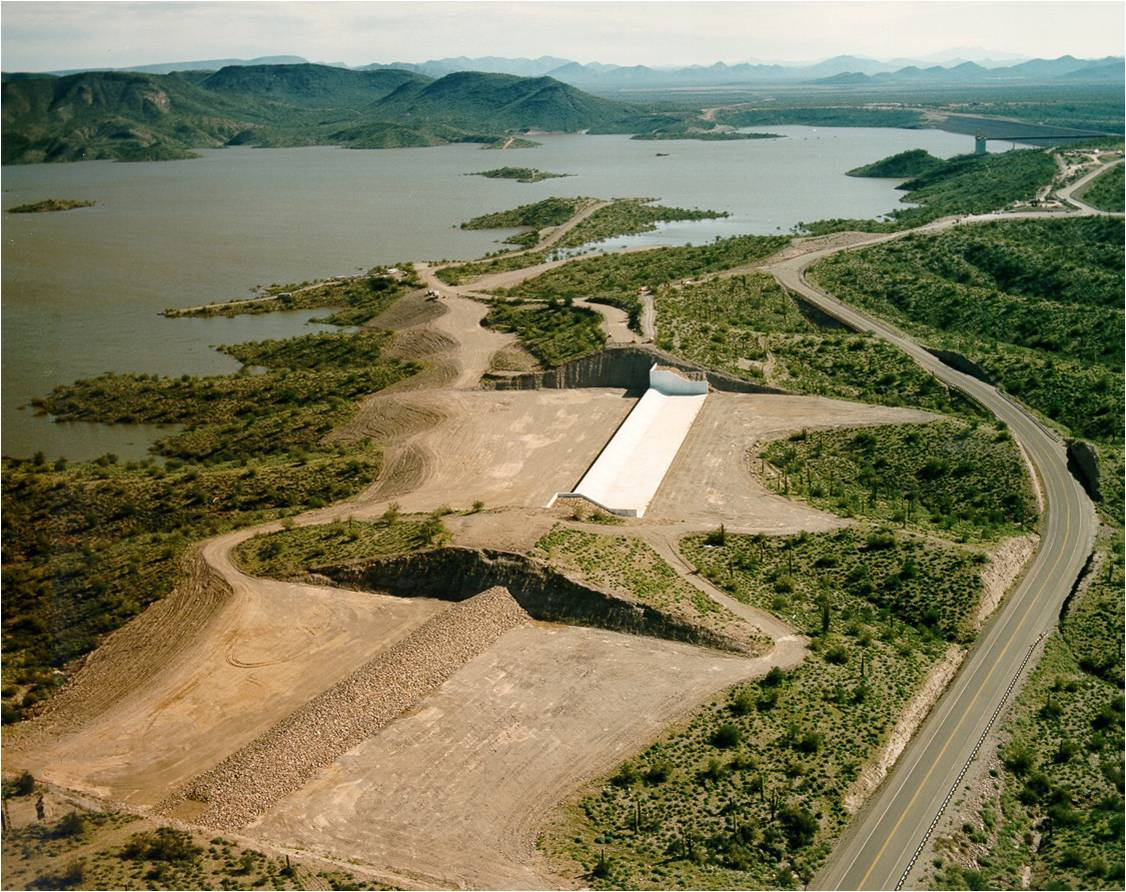
An emergency spillway with fuse plug (bottom) and an auxiliary ogee spillway (top) at New Waddell Dam

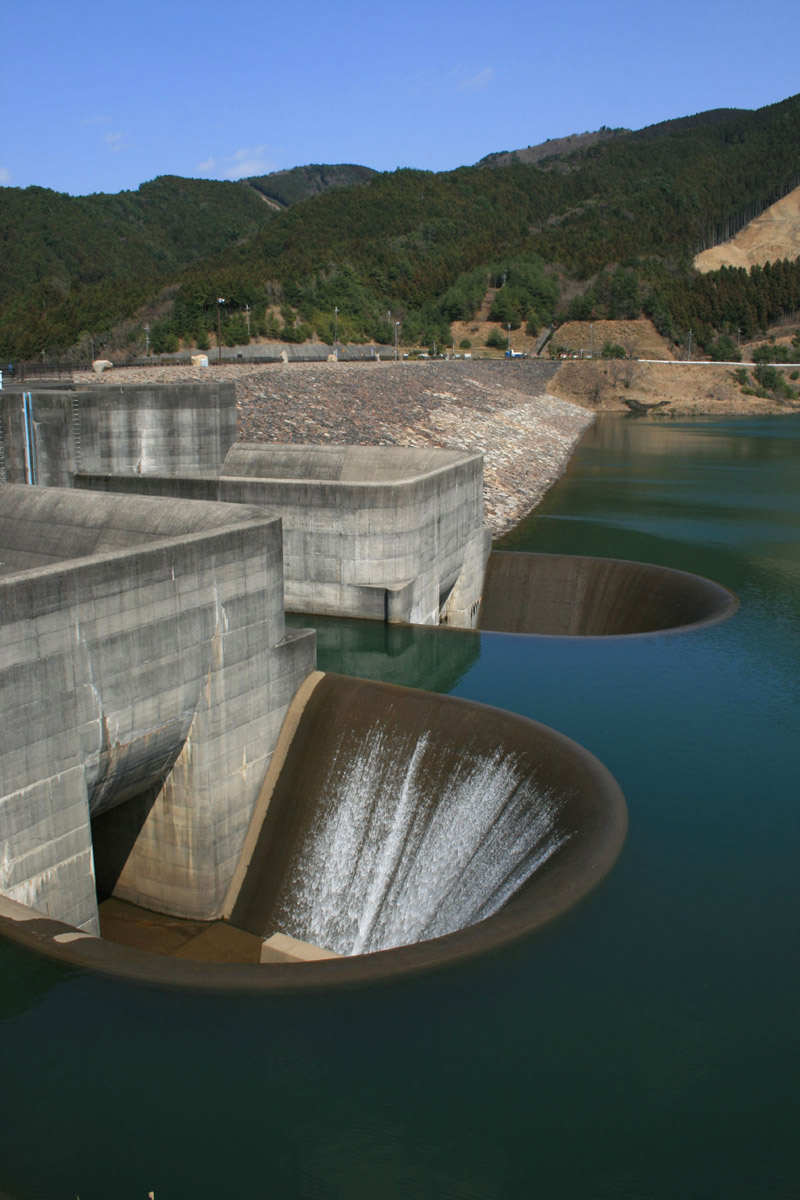
Semicircular spillways of Ohzuchi Dam (Shiga Pref., Japan)

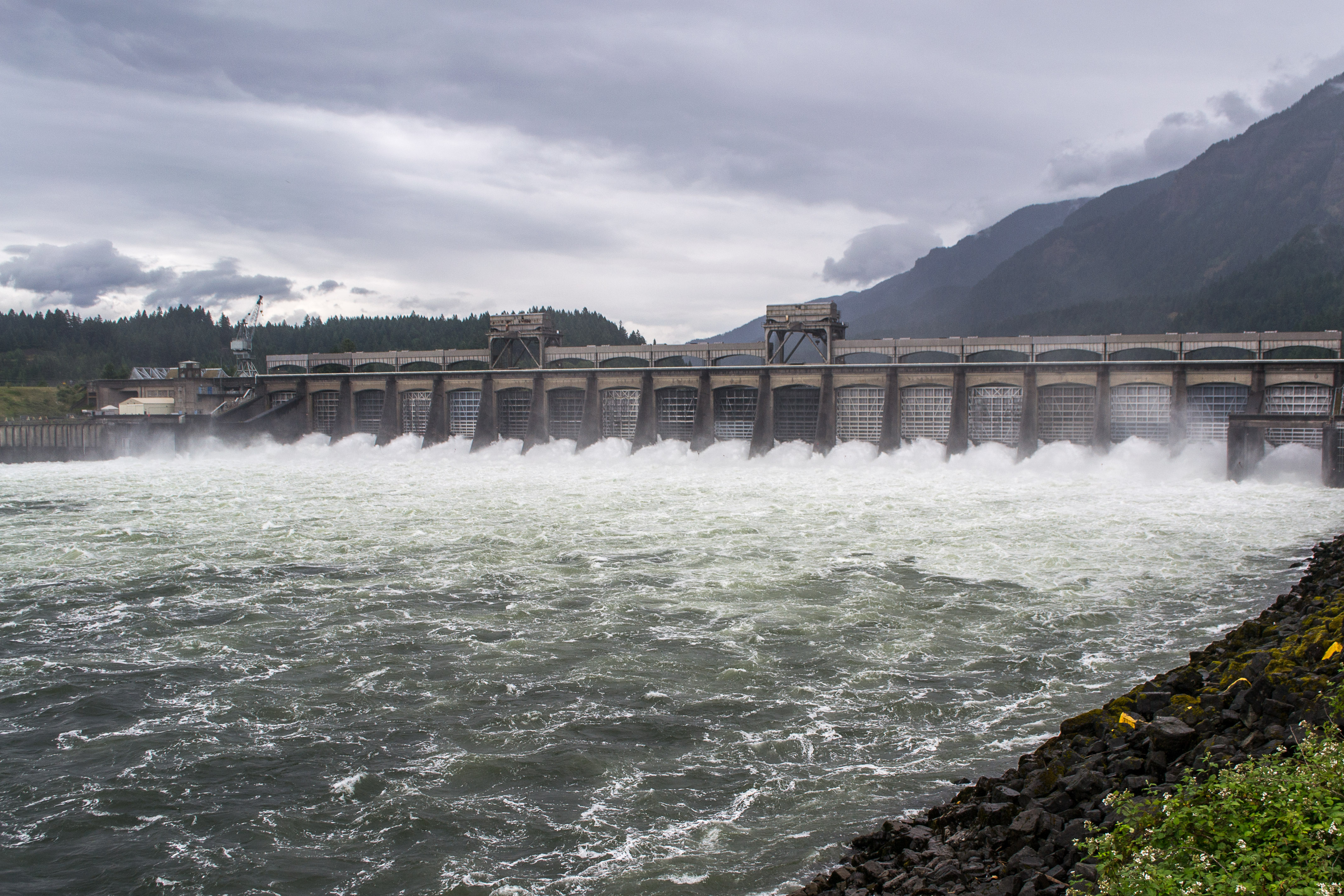
Low-height spillway of Bonneville Dam with sluice gates

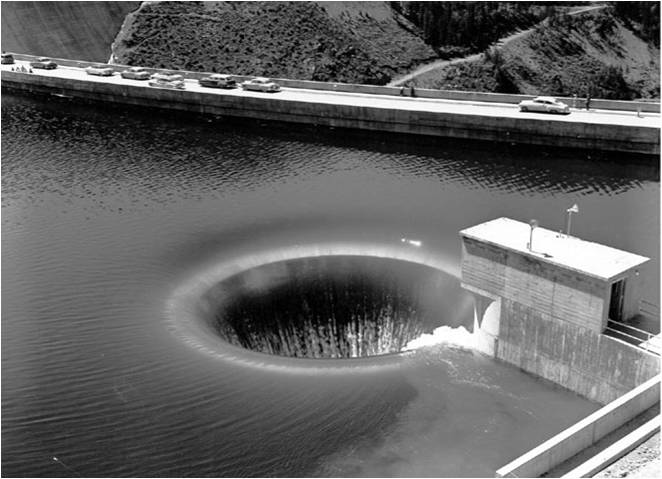
Bell-mouth spillway of Hungry Horse Dam in operation

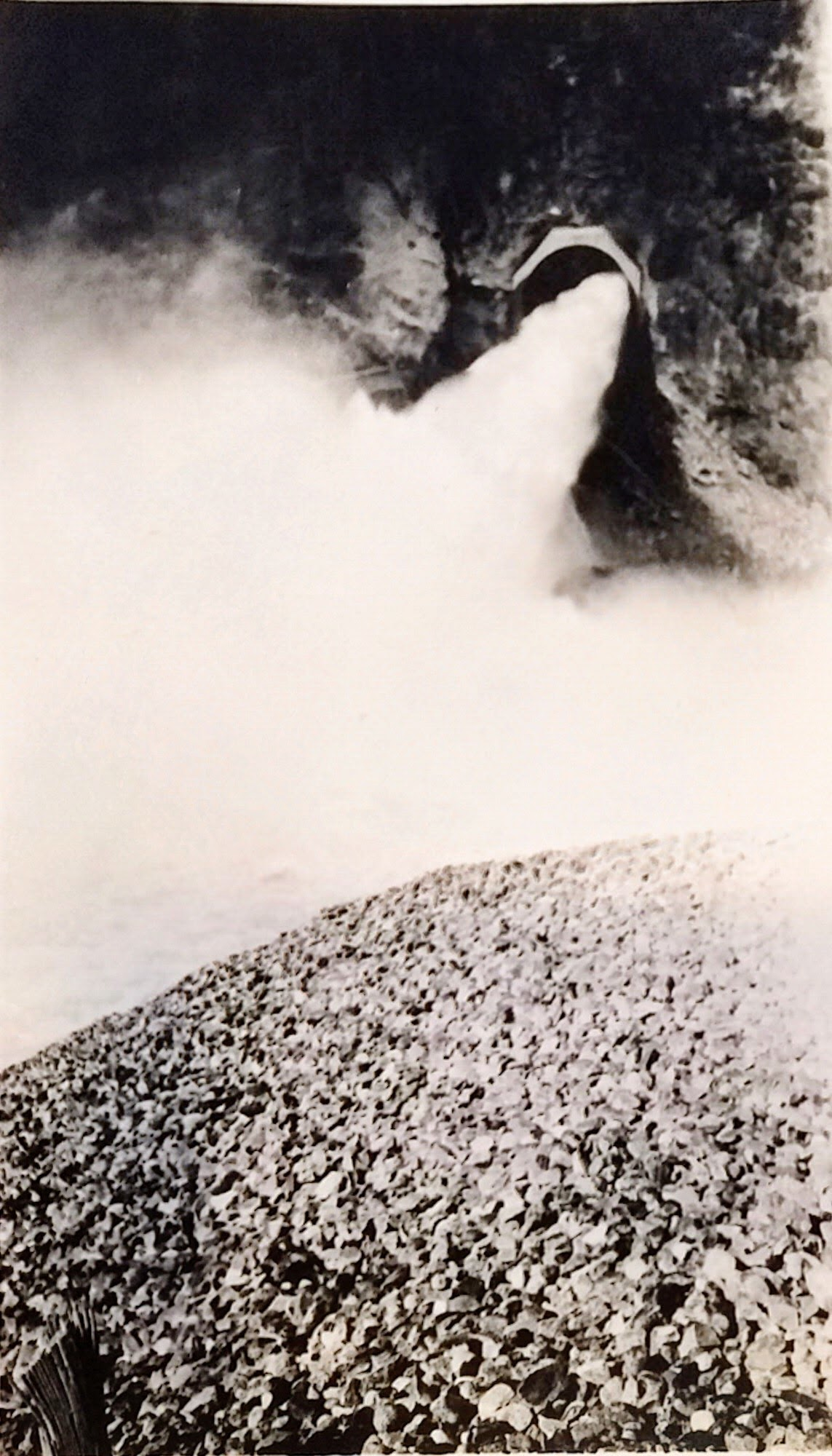
A drop inlet in use at Horse Mesa Dam in Arizona, circa 1940

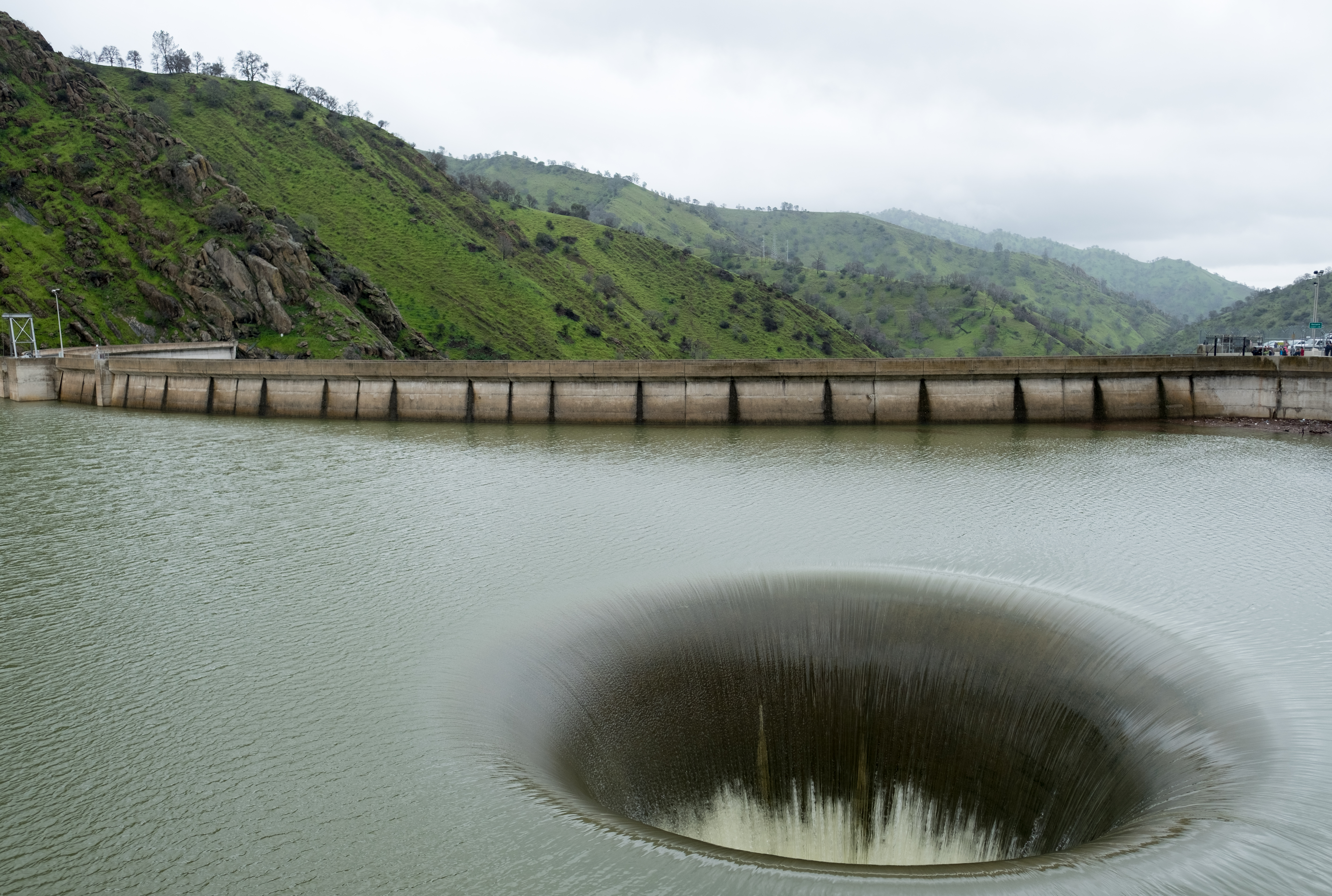
The spillway at Monticello Dam, Lake Berryessa, in operation February 19, 2017

The Geehi Dam bell-mouth spillway exposed at low water

== See also ==
- Dam safety system
- Reservoir
- Stepped spillway
- Fish ladder
- Tailrace fishing
- Toddbrook Reservoir
- Oroville Dam crisis
