= List of heritage sites in Ashgrove =

Ashgrove is an inner north-western suburb in the City of Brisbane, Queensland, Australia. It has many heritage-listed buildings:

- 44 Ashbourne Street: Oakleigh State School
- 24–30 Ashgrove Avenue (27.4434°S 152.9940°E): Ashgrove Methodist Church (former)
- 116 Ashgrove Avenue (27.4386°S 152.9985°E): Grove Lodge
- 120 Ashgrove Avenue: Anzac Cottage
- 140 Ashgrove Avenue: 140 Ashgrove Avenue, Ashgrove
- 60 Ashgrove Crescent: Shop
- 2 Atthow Avenue: 2 Atthow Avenue, Ashgrove
- 34 Devonshire Street: 34 Devonshire Street, Ashgrove
- 40 Dorset Street: 40 Dorset Street, Ashgrove
- 67 Elimatta Drive (27.4444°S 152.9881°E): Grantuly (sometimes written as Grantully)
- 182 Frasers Road: Tower Block & Memorial Gates Marist College
- Glenlyon Drive: Avenue of Trees
- 34 Glenlyon Drive (27.4452°S 152.9796°E): Glen Lyon
- 31 Glory Street (27.4476°S 152.9774°E): Ashgrove State School
- Kenwyn Road: Porphyry retaining wall, Ithaca Creek
- 9 Killawarra Road: 9 Killawarra Road, Ashgrove
- 16 Lindsay Street: 16 Lindsay Street, Ashgrove
- 1 Mareeba Road: Air Raid Shelter
- 47 Mclean Parade: 47 Mclean Parade, Ashgrove
- 16 Oleander Drive (27.4457°S 152.9864°E): former St David's Presbyterian/Uniting Church
- 31 Piddington Street (27.4459°S 152.9723°E): St John's Wood House
- 33 Piddington Street: former St John's Wood servants' quarters
- 8 Stewart Road: Tram Shelter
- 8 Stewart Road: Stewart Place (including war memorial)
- 142 St Johns Avenue: Ashgrove Golf Course (part)
- Waterworks Road (near Mossvale Street): Ithaca Bridge
- Waterworks Road: Tram Shelter
- 101 Waterworks Road: former Tram Shelter
- 152 Waterworks Road: 152 Waterworks Road, Ashgrove
- 180 Waterworks Road: 180 Waterworks Road, Ashgrove
- 202 Waterworks Road: St Finbarr's Catholic Church
- 290 Waterworks Road: St Paul's Anglican Church
- 309 Waterworks Road: former Ashgrove Private Hospital
- 498 Waterworks Road: Montvue Buildings
- 24 Woodland Street (27.4446°S 152.9980°E): Woodlands
