= Ashgrove Uniting Church =

Place of worship in Brisbane, Queensland, Australia

Ashgrove Uniting Church (former)
- The Grove Uniting Church
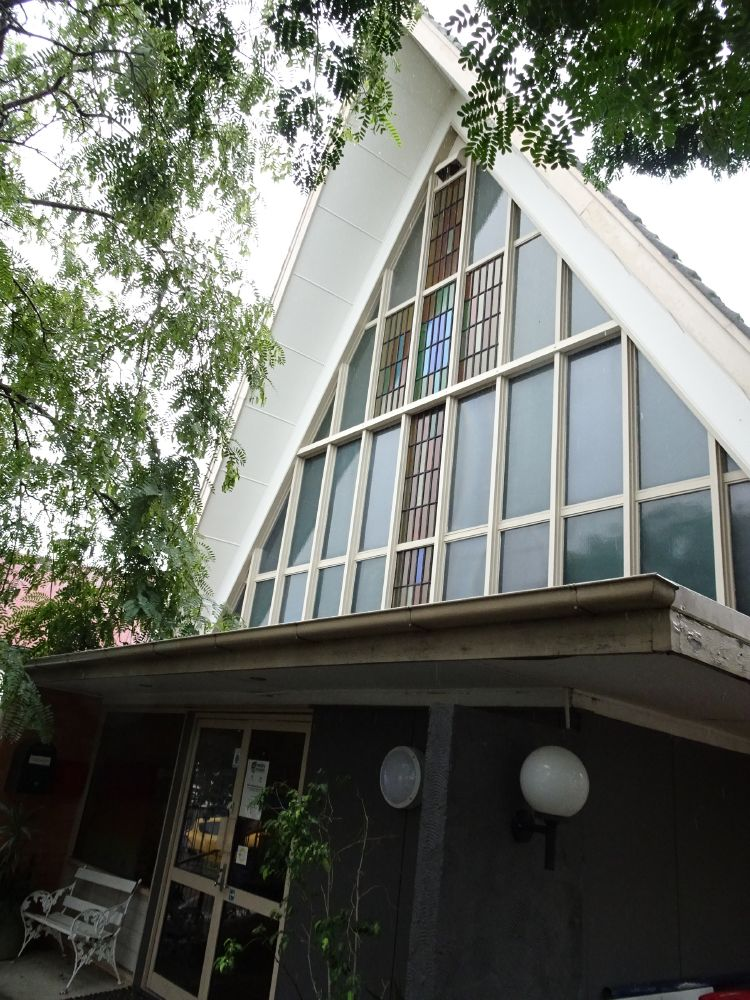
- Former Ashgrove Uniting Church, front vestibule and glass cross, 2021
- Ashgrove Uniting Church (former)
- 27.4434°S 152.9940°E
- Address: 24–30 Ashgrove Avenue, Ashgrove, City of Brisbane, Queensland
- Country: Australia
- Previous denomination: Methodist (1962–1977); Uniting (1977–2010)

History
- Former name: Ashgrove Methodist Church
- Status: Office space (since 2010); Church (1962–2010)
- Founded: October 1961
- Founder: Reverend Tainton
- Dedicated: April 1962

Architecture
- Functional status: Closed (as a church)
- Architect(s): James Gibson of Cross and Bain
- Architectural type: Church
- Style: Modernist architecture
- Construction cost: A£18,000
- Closed: 2010
- Demolished: 2024

Queensland Heritage Register
- Official name: Ashgrove Methodist Church (former); The Grove Uniting Church
- Type: State heritage (built)
- Designated: 25 June 2021
- Reference no.: 650267
- Type: Religion/worship: Church
- Theme: Creating social and cultural institutions: Worshipping and religious institutions

Ashgrove Uniting Church was a heritage-listed former church at 24–30 Ashgrove Avenue, Ashgrove, City of Brisbane, Queensland, Australia. Established in 1962 as the Ashgrove Methodist Church, the church is also known as The Grove Uniting Church. It was designed by James Gibson of Cross and Bain. It was added to the Queensland Heritage Register on 25 June 2021.

The former Methodist and subsequently Uniting church was closed in 2010 and was subsequently fitted out for office use. It was removed from the heritage register in 2024 following a court case initiated by the Uniting Church in Australia. and demolished in 2024.

== History ==
The former Ashgrove Uniting Church is located in the Brisbane suburb of Ashgrove, with frontage to Ashgrove Avenue. It comprises two former church buildings, a 1962 church and a 1934 hall (situated at the rear of the site, along Devoy street). The 1962 church was designed by James Gibson, of architectural firm, Cross and Bain. It replaced an earlier 1890s church and hall, moved to the rear of the site and subsequently used as the church hall. The design of the 1960s church adopted Modernist architectural principles and reflects the intention of the Ashgrove Methodist Church in the 1960s to be a relevant and current faith, following a movement of increased religiosity throughout Queensland at this time.

=== Ashgrove ===
Ashgrove, a Brisbane suburb approximately 4 km northwest of the central business district, the traditional country of the Yuggera and Turrbal people, was progressively surveyed and offered for private sale from 1842. Early occupation in Brisbane was largely focussed on town land on opposite sides of the river at North Brisbane and South Brisbane, while suburban areas developed more slowly. By 1856 small farms had been established in the area that later developed as Ashgrove. With the construction of Enoggera Reservoir in the early 1860s and the formation of its access road, Waterworks Road, the area was settled by wealthy Brisbane residents, eager to escape the increasingly crowded inner-urban Brisbane.

During this period "villa estates", located in the suburban periphery in then semi-rural settings, on elevated locations such as along ridgelines, or river frontages, became an increasingly popular type of dwelling for Brisbane's more affluent residents. This demographic included high ranking public servants, professionals and successful business people. Villa estates in the Ashgrove area included Glen Lyon, St Johns Wood, and Woodlands. One of the earliest residential subdivisions in the area known today as Ashgrove, was the Grove Estate. Land sales began on this estate in the mid- 1880s.

=== Methodism in Brisbane ===
Methodism arose as a group movement within the Church of England in the early 18th century during the industrial and agrarian revolutions. It spread rapidly throughout the United States of America in the late 18th and early 19th centuries through itinerant preachers and later throughout the world through Methodist missionaries. The term "Methodism" arose from the methodical way the Christian faith was approached and included an emphasis on preaching, evangelism, a love for singing, and social activism.

==== First Methodist church ====
The first Methodist church in Brisbane, a modest brick chapel, was constructed in 1849 on the corner of Albert Street and Burnett Lane, which was replaced in 1856 by a larger building, and then in 1889 by the Albert Street Methodist Church (now the Albert Street Uniting Church). As other Methodist churches were established in burgeoning Brisbane suburbs at this time, the Albert Street church was viewed as the central Methodist Church for Brisbane.

The population of the Grove Estate slowly increased in the late 19th century, and a Wesleyan Methodist Sunday school was started in 1889 in a private home. Methodist Church services were held in both a private residence and a tent, and given by Reverend Ellison who visited from the Paddington circuit. In 1891 the Grove Estate congregation managed to have an 1880s timber church, that had served as the Red Hill Wesleyan Church, relocated to a recently acquired site on Harry Street, which had been bought for £70. This was the first church established on the Grove Estate. Initially known as the Grove Estate Wesleyan Church, it not only held religious services and Sunday school, but also musical concerts and community meetings.

Initially, the Grove Estate church belonged to the Ithaca Methodist circuit. By 1903, it had become clear that the church would need to be extended to cope with the growing congregation. Additions were made to the timber church, which were completed in early 1904. In the same year, the Grove Estate church became part of the Paddington Methodist circuit.

By 1918, the congregation had continued to grow and the church's trustees were able to purchase three lots (now Lots 606–608 RP 20481) of vacant land along Three Mile Scrub Road (now Ashgrove Avenue). The new land acquisition was prominently sited on the ridge of the hill, in contrast to the original sloping Harry Street site. In 1918, the timber church was moved to the new site, with its frontage to Three Mile Scrub Road on Lot 607. It remained the only church in the Ashgrove district at this time.

In the 1920s, Ashgrove underwent rapid development. The expansion of Ashgrove saw the population increase from 144 in 1911 to 2500 in 1926. Until this time, the area was still sparsely developed. In 1920, the Grove Estate Progress Association held a public meeting in the Methodist Church to garner support to lobby the government for a 1-mile (1.6 km) extension to the tramline. The church was filled to capacity with community members enthusiastic to see the line extension go ahead. Following a deputation to the government, the request was successful and a one-line extension was completed in 1924. This led to subdivision of large landholdings for housing, including Glen Lyon Gardens, Oakleigh and Graham estates, and St John's Wood. Other denominations established churches in Ashgrove at this time, including St Paul's Anglican Church and St Finbarr's Catholic Church. At this time, the Ashgrove Methodist Church established its own circuit, the Ashgrove circuit, which included The Gap.

A permanent Methodist parsonage was constructed in 1928–1929, with its frontage to Ashgrove Avenue. There had been a succession of parsons since the forming of the Ashgrove circuit, and "it was realised that it was not in the best interests of the circuit to have such frequent changes in the ministry and in order to secure a more permanent minister they must have a parsonage". Having successful raised the funds and purchased an adjacent 20 perch or 505-square-metre (5,440 sq ft) lot (605 RP 20481), in October 1928 the stump-capping ceremony was held. The new parsonage was designed by architect Ronald Martin Wilson and cost £579. It was described as a:

"seven-roomed dwelling of the bungalow type. It will have a parlour, study, dining nook, two bedrooms, kitchen, and bathroom. There will be two verandahs, which will converge at the main entrance, thus giving the place a double front".

The building had been completed by January 1929 when the official opening ceremony was held.

As the suburb and congregation grew, a new Sunday school was established in Ashgrove West in the late 1920s, and in 1931 a new hall was constructed on a site along Waterworks Road, close to the Glen Lyon Gardens Estate. This hall, also to be used as a church, was named the Ashgrove West Methodist Church.

In 1934, a large addition to the rear of the Ashgrove Methodist Church was made, comprising a two-storey addition behind the existing church'. Photographic evidence from the time shows the addition on a west-east axis with a gable at each end. The new addition was "for the purpose of providing more accommodation for the Sunday School and for carrying out well-organised plan of youth work". The stump-capping ceremony was held in early May and the addition complete by June 1934. The design of the new wing was attributed to architect WJ Kerrison.

The 1950s was a prosperous time with low unemployment and a growing sense of optimism following World War II. There was also a renewed religiosity over most denominations throughout Queensland. It was a period of substantial change and reform within the Methodist and other Christian denominations throughout Australia, as they sought to become more relevant to modern society. Developments in theology and liturgy, coupled with an expansionary building program, led to a radical departure from established architectural traditions. Reflecting international trends, church designs moved away from historical revival styles and became increasingly influenced by Modernism. However, it was expected that a church would still be recognisable as such, resulting in a wide range of variations combining traditional church elements, symbols, and functions with new construction techniques, materials, and forms. A new flexibility in the planning and spatial organisation of modern churches resulted in an immense variety of plan arrangements that broke away from the traditional cruciform or rectangular plan. These altered church interiors reflected the community celebration of worship, without distance between clergy and people.

Many new Methodist churches, Sunday school halls, and parsonages were constructed throughout Queensland in the 1950s, replacing older buildings and meeting demand in new suburbs and growing regions. In addition, the church constructed new buildings to support its various charities and organisations including aged persons homes, hostels, Young People's Department (YPD) Camps, and Kings College at the University of Queensland St Lucia campus (opened 1955).

Methodist optimism following World War II was demonstrated in "a series of nationalistic [sic] evangelistic campaigns, which climaxed in the Mission to the Nation". Carried out between 1953 and 1957, the Mission was the largest attempt ever made by the Methodist Church to "reform the nation", emphasising the Christian faith as the only answer to social and industrial problems. Meetings were held in capital cities and main provincial centres throughout the country, conducted by campaign leader Reverend Alan Walker. Attracting large crowds, the crusade received wide newspaper and radio coverage.

By the early 1950s, the population of Ashgrove had reached almost 9000 people. This coincided with an overall population increase in Brisbane of 25%, due to the postwar "baby boom" and increased immigration. Brisbane's Methodist membership had increased from 5450 members in 1947 to 8251 in 1961. This resulted in a marked improvement in church finances and the subsequent church-building boom. Many new churches were built in Brisbane's newly established postwar suburbs. In the older suburbs, there was a move to replace the original timber churches with modern churches, designed along contemporary lines and using new techniques and materials. By the end of the 1960s up to 120 new churches were constructed in Brisbane.

==== Second Methodist church ====
By 1958, the Ashgrove Methodist congregation had begun discussions in relation to the construction of a new church on the Ashgrove Avenue site. The architectural firm commissioned to design the new church was Cross and Bain, specifically, its architect, James Gibson (1932–2018). It was hoped that the new church would be modern and reflect the congregation's intention to be relevant and current. Gibson joined the firm in 1953 (until 1976) and was responsible for designing up to 10 churches. These included St Matthew's Church of England, Holland Park (1958), Toowong Presbyterian Church (1960), St Paul's Church of England, Manly (1964) and the Indooroopilly Methodist Church (1975). In his publication, Except the Lord Build, A Manual of Building for Presbyterian Congregations, Gibson wrote that, "it should be our aim to proclaim to society some statements regarding our faith which can be reflected in our buildings - strength and boldness, simplicity and truthfulness, warmth and openness".

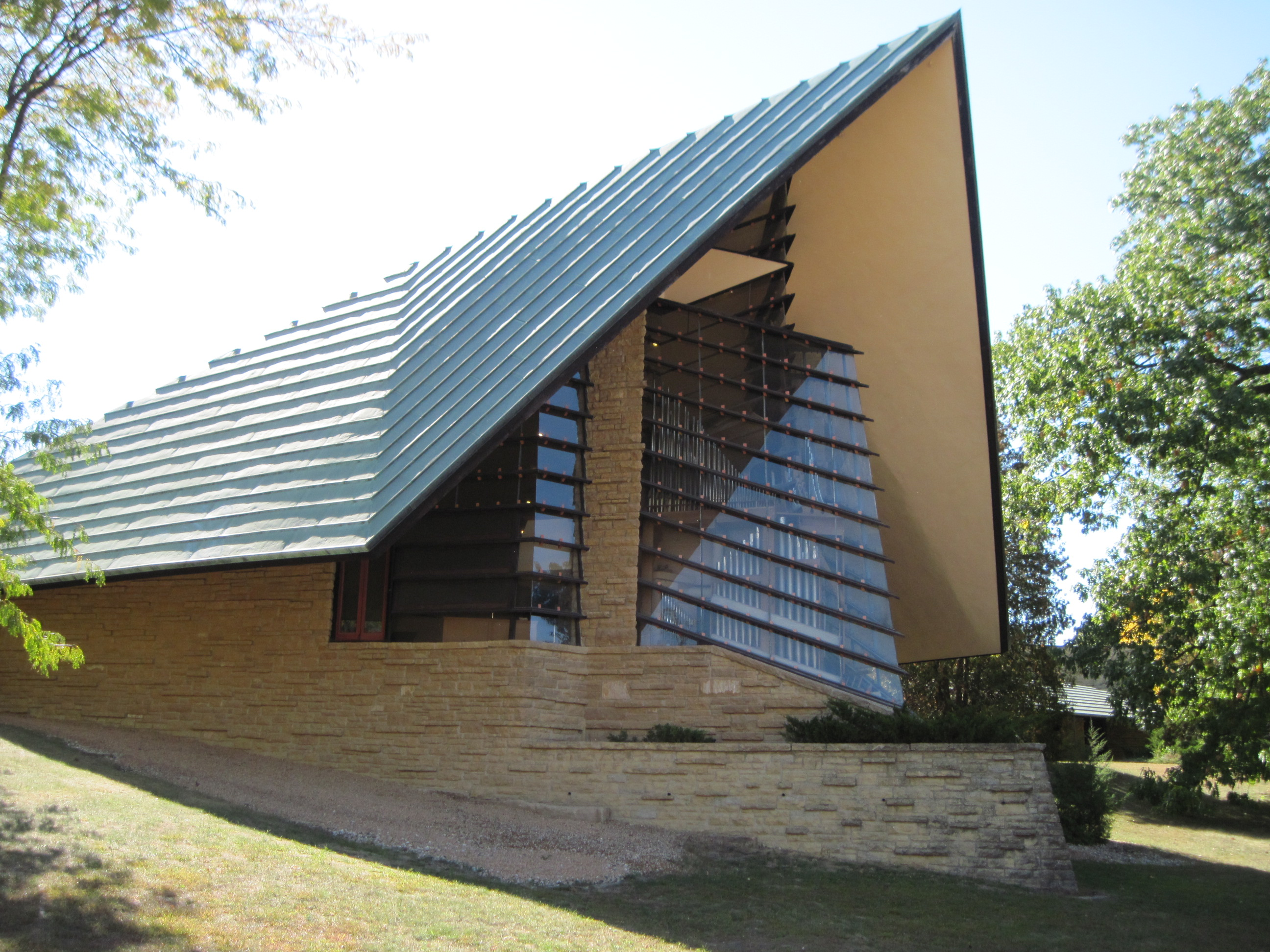
Meeting House of the First Unitarian Society, designed by Frank Lloyd Wright.

Gibson designed the new Ashgrove church as an A-frame Modernist structure and followed a traditional layout with a central aisle and front raised sanctuary. Impressive examples of this architectural form had been built in Europe and the United States, such as Frank Lloyd Wright's Meeting House of the First Unitarian Society, Wisconsin, and may have influenced Gibson's design for Ashgrove. Other examples of A-frame churches in the United States include Lutheran Concordia Senior College Chapel, Fort Wayne, Indiana and St Andrew's Lutheran Church, Illinois.

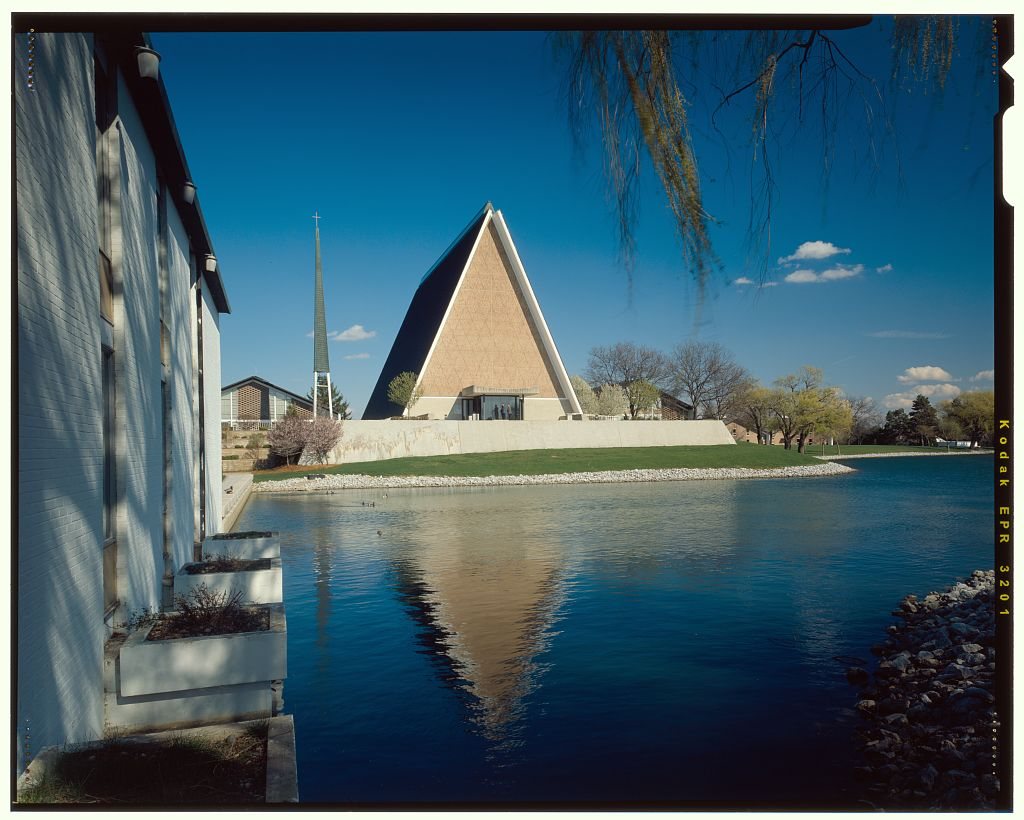
Lutheran Concordia Senior College Chapel, Fort Wayne, Indiana

To accommodate the new church, only part of the original timber church was relocated down the hill. This was the 1934 two-storey rear gabled addition which retained its west-east axis. The Ashgrove Methodist newsletter reported that:

"the church hall has been moved to a new site in the grounds and the old church demolished. The site is being prepared for the pouring of the foundations of the new church."

In October 1961, the foundation stone was set by the President of the Conference, Reverend Tainton. The church was opened in April 1962 and had cost A£18,000. The modern church was featured on the front page of the Methodist Times in late March of that year. It was described as:

"one of the most striking examples of contemporary church architecture in Brisbane ... the chief feature ... is the roof, which is designed on the A-line principle. It will measure forty feet [12.19m] from apex to base and will be covered with green tiles ... non-actinic glass will permit of adequate lighting. The wide expanse of glass above the vestibule will feature a large cross with coloured glass panels on each side ... the two vestries will be provided under the main roof of the Church and they will be situated behind the spacious area in which will be the Holy Table, pulpit and the choir stalls."

All furniture within the church was bespoke: maple timber: pews, communion table and rail, pulpit, baptismal font, choir stall and minister's chairs. It was described as "comfortable and attractive". Gibson believed that the interior furniture was equally as important as the design of the actual church building, "the work of furnishing the completed building is no less important than the work of construction. The design of the building is only given meaning by the furniture it must house for its proper functioning. The placement of furniture must be considered at the design stage." The timber floor was crow's ash.

Unlike the original 1890s church that faced Ashgrove Avenue, the new church's axis was west to east, sideways from the street. The vestibule had two entrance doors, one facing Ashgrove Avenue and the other, the western courtyard, closely situated to the 1929 parsonage. The prominent A-frame roof was clad in green cement tiles. The highest point of the sloping roof, rising 15.9 metres (52 ft), was at the vestibule end, substituting the traditional spire. The lowest, at 10.2 metres (33 ft), was the eastern sanctuary end, beneath which the service was delivered. This was to symbolise the equality between the ministers and the congregation. The church's form was fan-shaped and featured an electric organ alcove, situated behind the choir stalls in the sanctuary.

The former church building was the first A-frame church to be built in Brisbane. However, the A-frame form was not uncommon for churches of the period in Queensland, with St Peter's Catholic Church, Halifax (1960) and St Andrew's Presbyterian Memorial Church, Innisfail (1961) both completed before the 1962 Ashgrove Methodist Church. A number of other A-frame churches were constructed in the following years including Holy Cross Catholic Church in Eton.

In Brisbane, a number of Modernist A-frame churches were constructed for various denominations in the early 1960s. Although the Ashgrove Methodist Church was the first to be completed (1962), it was contemporary with the prominent and grander chapel at Stuartholme Catholic Girls College at Mount Coot-tha (Toowong), which was completed in 1963. In March 1962 The Courier-Mail featured both churches close to completion, and remarked on the unusual A-frame structures. In 1962, the Holland Park Methodist Church was built on Logan Road, and in 1964 the Memorial Church of Our Lady of Mount Carmel Catholic Church at Coorparoo was completed. As at 2021, all these churches are extant.

=== Establishment of the Uniting Church ===
In 1977, when the Uniting Church was officially formed by the amalgamation of Methodist, Presbyterian and Congregational Churches, the Ashgrove Methodist Church became known as the Ashgrove Uniting Church. In the 1990s (while the church remained in use) renovations were made to the interior including the removal of the original sanctuary and vestry. Much of the original furniture was removed and a new stained-glass window at the eastern end of the church was introduced.

In 2010, the church was closed due to declining congregation numbers. The church building was subsequently fitted out for office use. Additions were made to the church hall in the 1960s and from 1980 was leased by the Ashgrove Dance Studio, a local dance school which remains the main occupant of the hall as at 2021.

== Description ==
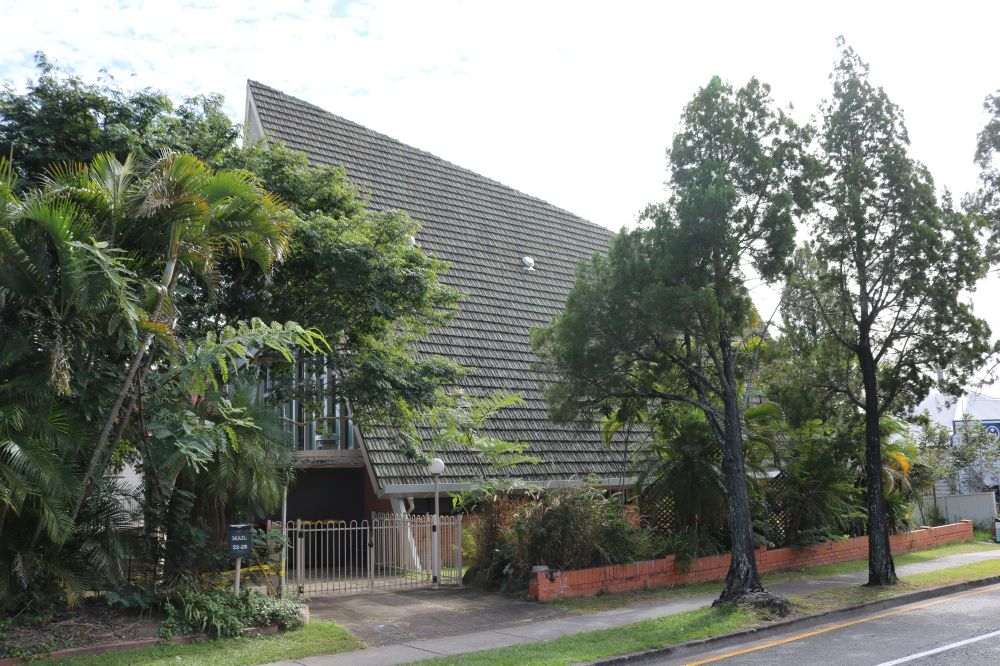
Side view from Ashgrove Avenue, 2021

The former Ashgrove Methodist Church is located on Ashgrove Avenue near the three-way intersection of Ashgrove Avenue, Holmesbrook Street, and Devoy Street in Ashgrove, approximately 4 kilometres northwest of the Brisbane CBD. The 1689m2 property slopes from Ashgrove Avenue on its southern boundary down to Devoy Street at its northern boundary and is bounded on its other sides by residential and small-scale commercial properties. The northern half of the site contains the church hall (1934, extended by 1951, moved within the site 1961, extended by 1969) which does form part of the heritage listing. The former church grounds are bounded on the Ashgrove Avenue boundary by a short brick wall, tropical gardens and timber lattice screens. A concrete driveway extends between both street frontages along the western side.

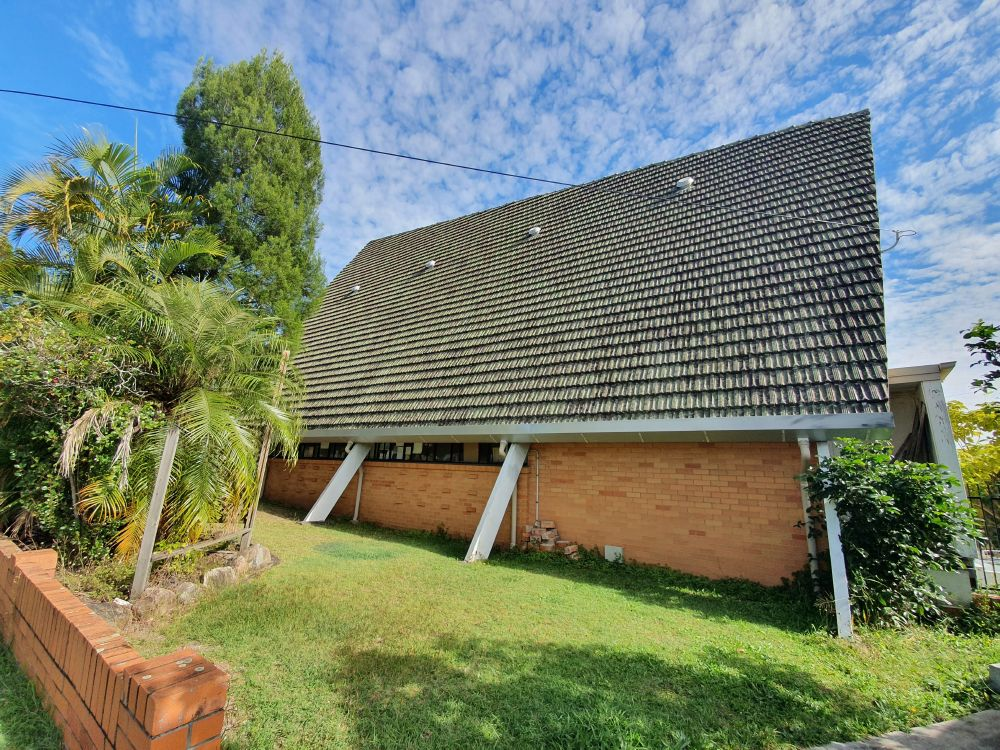
South-east side of the church showing portal frame extending below eaves, 2021

The former church (1962) is an A-frame building standing with its long sides parallel to Ashgrove Avenue on the highest part of the site. It is single-storey and its roof has a sloping ridgeline, taller and wider at its front (southwest gable end), where the former church's main entrance is. The steeply pitched main roof is clad in green-coloured cement tiles with eaves extending low to the ground on both sides. The shape is formed by metal portal frames, which extend from below the eaves clear of the exterior walls and meet the ground on concrete footings. Both gable ends of the building have face brick walls and are glazed, with the front featuring a coloured glass cross pattern. The side walls on the southeast are face brick, the northwest walls are clad in timber vertically jointed (VJ) boards and the subfloor is enclosed by hit-and-miss concrete blocks.

A wide concrete footpath leads from Ashgrove Avenue through gardens to the main entrance of the former church. The entry vestibule retains original tiled floors and a brick wall with decorative openings into the nave. The former nave is a very tall space with raked ceilings and exposed A-frame portal frames. Its width and height diminish toward the former sanctuary at the far (northeastern) end. Original metal-framed windows run almost the entire length of the former nave and former sanctuary on both sides. Projecting from the roof on the northeastern side is the choir stall, a box-like room open to the nave near the former sanctuary.

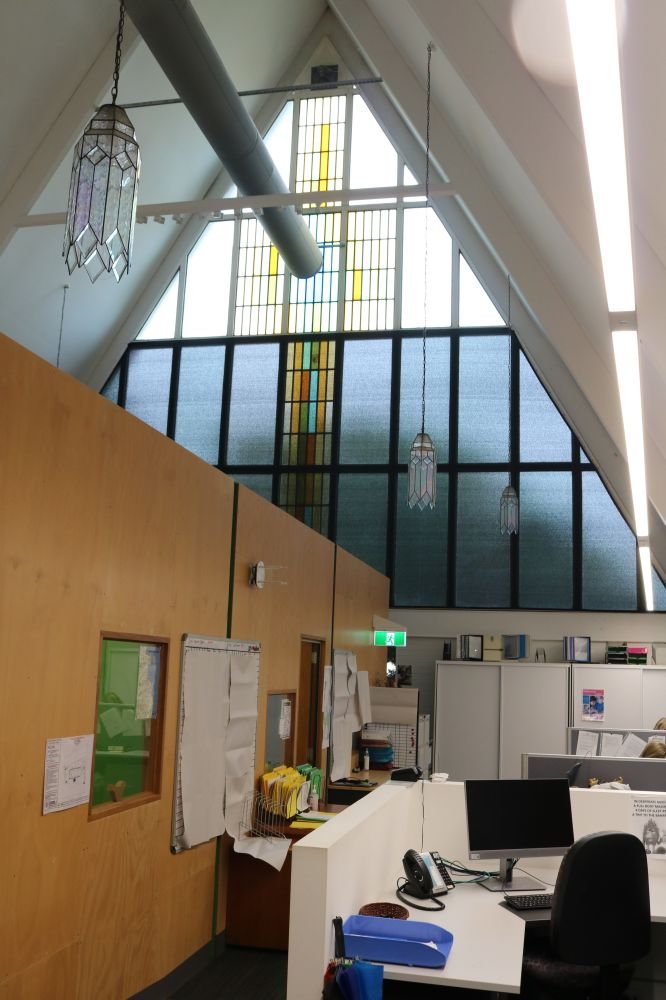
Nave of the church looking toward the front, while the church is being used as an office, 2021

As of 2021, the former church was used as an office building. The original layout of the former church was reorganised in the 1990s and again when it was converted to offices in the 2010s. The entry vestibule was partitioned to create a toilet and original doors and windows removed or replaced. An office structure has been inserted in the centre of the former nave. The original sanctuary plinth and partition between the former sanctuary and former vestry were replaced further to the rear of the former church, creating a larger nave (c. 1990s, reusing original timber doors in new locations). A kitchenette and partition have been added to the former vestry to form a lunchroom and separate plant and equipment room. Part of the former vestry's rear wall has been demolished and a lean-to extension added to accommodate storage and a rear entrance.

== Heritage listing ==
The former Ashgrove Methodist Church was listed on the Queensland Heritage Register on 25 June 2021 having satisfied the following criteria.

The place is important in demonstrating the evolution or pattern of Queensland's history.

The former Ashgrove Methodist Church built in 1962 is important in demonstrating the growth and expansion of the Methodist Church and the evolution of church architecture in the post-World War II period in Queensland. Through its modernist ecclesiastical architectural form, it is a representative example of a suburban Methodist church of this period, illustrating the post-war mission of the Church to become more relevant to modern society, and its progressive building program in the 1950s and early 1960s.

The place is important because of its aesthetic significance.

The former Ashgrove Methodist Church has aesthetic importance for its expressive attributes and architectural qualities. Through its siting, distinctive tapered A-frame form, main front elevation with large, coloured glass cross, and features of its modernist architectural style including its metal framed windows, face brick walls with extruded brick pattern, and green tiled roof, the place expresses the optimism, renewal and relevance of the Methodist Church at the time.

== Removal from the heritage register ==
The church was removed from the Queensland Heritage Register in 2024 following a court case initiated by the Uniting Church in Australia.
