= Ashgrove State School =

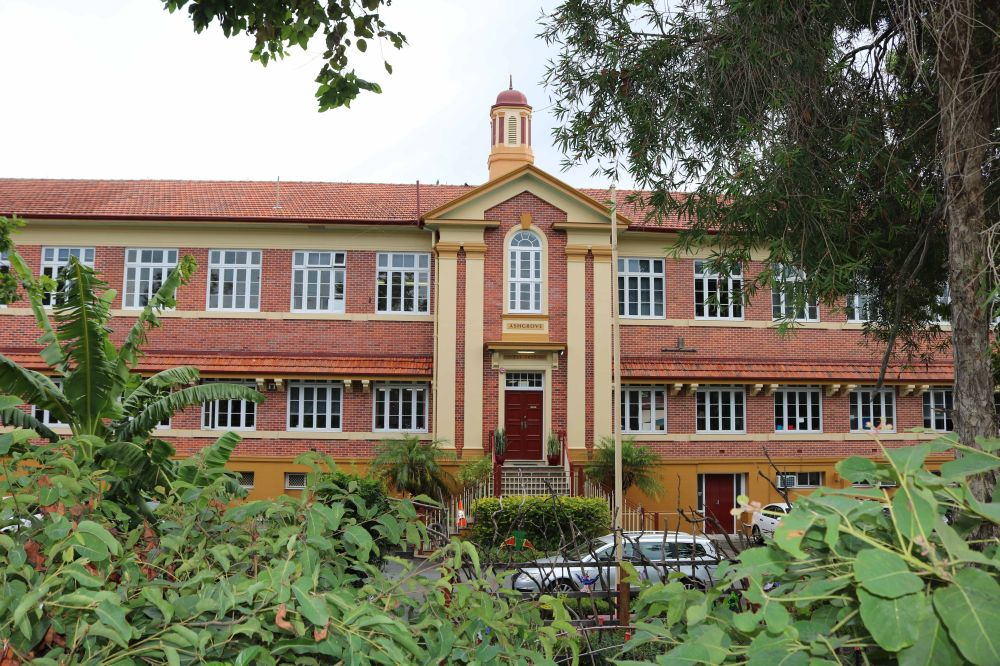
- Block A from the south, 2018

- Location within Queensland
- 27.4476°S 152.9774°E
- Location: 31 Glory Street, Ashgrove, City of Brisbane, Queensland, Australia

History
- Design period: 1939–1945 (World War II)
- Built: 1938–1959, Depression Era Brick School building

Site notes
- Architect(s): Andrew Baxter Leven; James Findlay Leven; Arthur James Edwin Moase
- Architectural style: Arts & Crafts

Queensland Heritage Register
- Official name: Ashgrove State School
- Type: state heritage
- Designated: 24 April 2018
- Reference no.: 650058
- Type: Education, research, scientific facility: School-state
- Theme: Educating Queenslanders: Providing primary schooling

Ashgrove State School is a heritage-listed state school at 31 Glory Street, Ashgrove, City of Brisbane, Queensland, Australia. It was designed by Andrew Baxter Leven, James Findlay Leven and Arthur James Edwin Moase. The Depression-era brick school building was built from 1938 to 1959. It was added to the Queensland Heritage Register on 24 April 2018.

== History ==
Ashgrove State School, established 1876 on a site opposite the current school, is situated 5.5 kilometres (3.4 mi) northwest of the Brisbane CBD and opened on its current site in 1925. It is important in demonstrating the evolution of state education and its associated architecture. It retains one Depression-era brick school building built in stages (Block A: 1938, 1947, 1959), a playing field partially formed by relief workers and a Boulton and Paul prefabricated building and its Department of Public Works extension (Block B: 1953, 1956).

Ashgrove was traditionally part of the land of the Turrbal people. Government auction of the small farms here began in 1856. In January 1876, a public meeting was held at St John's Wood, the home of George Rogers Harding, with the intention of establishing a local school. Harding, a barrister and later a Supreme Court judge, had substantial land holdings in the area. The establishment of schools was considered an essential step in the development of new communities and integral to their success. Schools became a community focus, with the school community contributing to their maintenance and development; a symbol of progress; and a source of pride, with enduring connections formed with past pupils, parents and teachers. Residents donated £120 and Harding donated 2 acres (0.81 ha) of land situated on Portion 667 bounded by Waterworks Road and Glory Street at their intersection with Coopers Camp Road. The land was transferred to the Secretary for Public Instruction in May 1876.

To help ensure consistency and economy, the Queensland Government developed standard plans for its school buildings. From the 1860s until the 1960s, Queensland school buildings were predominantly timber-framed. Standard designs were continually refined in response to changing needs and educational philosophy and Queensland school buildings were particularly innovative in climate control, lighting, and ventilation. Standardisation produced distinctly similar schools across Queensland with complexes of typical components.

The Ashgrove State School was officially opened on 4 November 1876. It was the first school built following the introduction of the Education Act 1875, which created the Department of Public Instruction and provided free primary school education to children aged from 6–12. This small timber school cost £678, £104 of which was contributed by local residents. The opening ceremony was performed by the Minister for Education, the Hon Samuel Griffith. The site included a teachers residence. Poet James Brunton Stephens was the first head teacher when classes commenced on 22 January 1877.

The school building was extended in 1896 and in 1922. The Waterworks Road tramline was extended to Oleander Drive in 1924; concurrent with the subdivision and sale of the Glenlyon Gardens Estate by developer TM Burke. The Dorrington Park and Frasers Estates along Enoggera Creek, were also subdivided at this time. In July 1924, the school committee was advocating a new modern school.

In March 1924, the minister had approved a land transfer offered by Burke, whereby the original school site would be transferred to the developer in exchange for 5 acres (2.0 ha) on the opposite side of Glory Street. The school building was removed and relocated across the road to the new site on the northern side of Glory Street in 1925. The school building was enlarged for the official opening on 31 October 1925. Burke then acquired the original school site and subdivided it in 1926. The rapid expansion of Ashgrove saw the population increase from 144 in 1911 to 2500 in 1926. In August 1927, a further 800 housing allotments in the St Johns Wood and Royal Park estates were released. The Ashgrove School celebrated its jubilee in October 1927 with a fete aimed at raising funds to beautify the new school grounds.

The Great Depression, commencing in 1929 and extending well into the 1930s, caused a dramatic reduction of building work in Queensland and brought private building work to a standstill. In response, the Queensland Government provided relief work for unemployed Queenslanders, and also embarked on an ambitious and important building programme to provide impetus to the economy.

Even before the October 1929 stock market crash, the Queensland Government initiated an Unemployment Relief Scheme work programme managed by the Department of Public Works. This included painting and repairs to school buildings. By mid-1930, men were undertaking grounds improvement works to schools, creating many large school playing fields. These play areas became a standard inclusion within Queensland state schools and a characteristic element. The 1930 school fete raised funds to continue work on the school grounds, having already built a tennis and basketball court, with a football field and cricket pitch being developed at that time. Tree planting appears to have been minimal as in1931 the Queensland Government discontinued its Arbor Day program. initiated in the 1890s, where trees propagated at the Botanic Gardens were distributed to Queensland schools.

In June 1932 the Forgan Smith Labor Government came to power through a campaign that advocated increased government spending to counter the effects of the Depression. The government embarked on a large public works building programme designed to promote the employment of local skilled workers, the purchase of local building materials and the production of commodious, low maintenance buildings which would be a long-term asset to the state.

In June 1935, the Director of Education approved plans for a new brick school building for Ashgrove. Early plans were drawn up by Arthur James Edwin Moase of the Department of Public Works (DPW) in 1936, with more detailed plans produced in February 1937; both sets of drawings approved by the Chief Architect and Quantity Surveyor, Andrew Baxter Leven. Construction approval was given in April 1937. The tram terminus had just been extended and the West Ashgrove shops subsequently developed there.

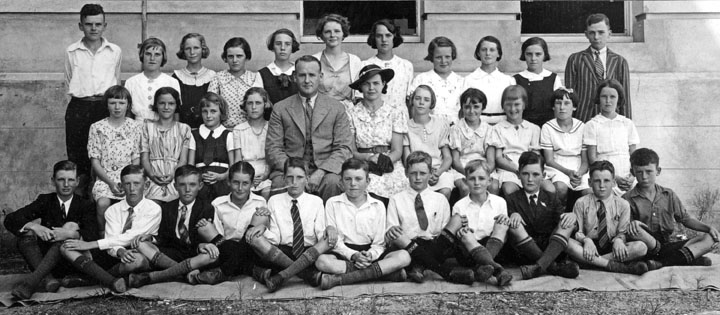
Children at Ashgrove State School, 11 February 1938

Depression-era brick school buildings form a recognisable and important type. Most were designed in a classical idiom to project the sense of stability and optimism which the government sought to convey through the architecture of its public buildings. Frequently, they were two storeys above an open undercroft and built to accommodate up to 1,000 students. They adopted a symmetrical plan form and often exhibited a prominent central entry. The plan arrangement was similar to that of timber buildings, being only one classroom deep, accessed by a long straight verandah or corridor. Due to their long plan forms of multiple wings, they could be built in stages if necessary; resulting in some complete designs never being realised. Classrooms were commonly divided by folding timber partitions and the undercroft was used as covered play space, storage, ablutions and other functions.

Despite their similarities, each Depression-era brick school building was individually designed by a DPW architect, which resulted in a wide range of styles and ornamental features within the overall set. These styles, derived from contemporary tastes and fashions, included: Arts and Crafts; Spanish Mission; and Neo-classical. Over time, variations occurred in building size, decorative treatment, and climatic-responsive features. Other schools of this E/B1 type were built in nearby Oakleigh State School and Ithaca Creek State School which both opened in 1934.

The new Ashgrove State School building (Block A) was opened by the Minister for Health and Home Affairs, Ned Hanlon on 19 March 1938. The two storey brick school, plus undercroft, was planned to be built in stages. Phase one of the brick school, costing £6,884, included four classrooms 19 by 21 feet (5.8 by 6.4 m) and a cloak room on each floor to accommodate 360 pupils, with the undercroft housing an office for the head teacher, large play area, drinking troughs and seats. It did not include the entrance foyer. The classrooms were connected by folding partitions, which could open to provide assembly areas. The building was roofed in terracotta Marseilles tiles. The future remaining portions were planned to accommodate 880 pupils, with the intention of completing the original plan of an E-shape form facing Glory Street. The building was not completed to the 1936 plan, with the eastern end only having a one-storey (understorey) section and the western end later being built to a similar, but not matching, plan.

In March 1937, the Department of Education began negotiations with Brisbane City Council (BCC) to acquire part of the 3.4-chain (220 ft; 68 m) wide gully on the eastern boundary of the school (Portion 715 - originally part of Woonga Drive), and a 1-chain (66 ft; 20 m) wide strip of the quarry on the western side to expand the playground. Access, but not ownership, was approved for the strip of the quarry. Portion 715 was surveyed in 1938 and transferred to the school in 1939. Woonga Drive was formed adjacent to the school by filling in the gully; including the retention of some trees along the new eastern boundary. Fill was procured from the quarry, financed by the Department of Education, with relief workers undertaking the labour, funded by the DPW. Funding for intermittent relief workers in school grounds was wound-down from September 1938, with the intention of creating full-time positions for workers. This left the Ashgrove playground in a dangerous state, according to a news report in October 1939. The government quickly allocated funds to employ 30 men for four weeks to complete the work.

In early 1939 the old school building was moved back across Waterworks Road, to a new site (534 Waterworks Road) for the Crèche and Kindergarten Association's first pre-school in Brisbane. By July 1939, the Ashgrove State School committee was seeking the construction of the second section of the brick building. This was delayed by the outbreak of World War II (WWII) two months later; the only construction at that time being the digging of slit trenches in the playground in January 1942.

While there was an intention to complete the brick building at the end of WWII, the shortage of materials impeded the process. Bricks were ordered from the Newmarket Brickworks in September 1945, but the brickworks site had been occupied by the army during the war and was yet to resume production. Instead, two additional temporary timber classrooms were added to the site in September 1945. Overcrowding was occurring, with 120 new pupils enrolled in 1947. The brick building was extended during early 1947 at a cost of £8,871. It included an entrance hall, head-teachers room, two classrooms on the ground floor, teachers' rooms and classrooms on the first floor, with a larger play area and a storeroom in the undercroft. The new male and female toilets and septic system, originally planned in 1945 were completed in 1947.

By February 1950, Ashgrove State School was in need of temporary classrooms following the initiation of the first prep classes, which generated an extra 90 enrolments. The DPW's post-war difficulties in procuring architects, tradesmen and building materials led to the use of temporary structures. The DPW imported 95 prefabricated school buildings, providing 106 classrooms, from Boulton and Paul Ltd of Norwich, England in 1951. They were erected at many schools across Queensland through to 1958.

Boulton and Paul buildings were timber-framed and timber-clad, had a verandah as circulation, and a gable roof. Ideally, they were oriented so the verandah faced north and the classroom faced south but were also added as extensions to existing buildings regardless of orientation. They had prefabricated wall and ceiling panels, roof trusses and banks of awning windows. The buildings, erected on concrete piers placed at 8-foot (2.4 m) centres were generally highset, providing play space underneath, and included semi-enclosed stairs between the classrooms and ground level. The buildings had extensive areas of timber-framed awning windows which provided more glazing than had ever been used in Queensland classrooms; almost the entirety of the verandah wall and the opposite classroom wall were glazed. Natural ventilation and lighting was abundant. The classrooms of building type FT1 were 24 by 24 feet (7.3 by 7.3 m), larger than most previous classrooms.

The Ashgrove State School's Boulton and Paul building (Block B) was completed by 1953. It was extended during 1955–56 with two DPW designed classrooms (type FT/4) on the western end of the building. The DPW design replicated the existing Boulton and Paul structure, although with higher window sills. The glass screening at the western end of the verandah was relocated to the western end of the extension at this time. In 1954, lavatory facilities were extended on the northern side of the ground floor of the eastern end of Block A. The 1-chain (66 ft; 20 m) wide strip on the western edge of the campus was acquired by the Education Department in 1956.

The post-WWII period was a time of architectural experimentation. In this new era, educators considered the brick buildings of the 1930s too severe and unsuited to modern educational ideas. They demanded up-to-date, "flexible" buildings of light construction using materials that were easy to clean. New designs were developed that borrowed from the successes of the Boulton and Paul buildings and included more and larger areas of glazing throughout, glazing-enclosed stairs, a floor truss system that eliminated the stumps of the understorey and created unencumbered play spaces, and larger classrooms. The next extension to the Ashgrove State School demonstrated this evolution in school design. It is thought that this wing was designed by Jim Leven, whose father Andrew Baxter Leven had approved the original building. Jim Leven had travelled, studied and worked in Europe and America between 1948 and 1953, the design of this wing reflects international design of the 1950s.

In 1957, plans for an extension to the brick school building were produced. Face bricks remained difficult to procure. This new wing, an amended, more modern version of the original 1935 plans, was constructed in a combination of brick, rendered brick and ribbed panels, with awning windows to the south, and was completed in 1959. It comprised three additional classrooms (20, 24 and 26 ft (6.10, 7.32 and 7.92 m) wide) to the first and second floors, and toilets and open play space to the understorey. The northern elevation did not fulfil the intended E-shape footprint of the original plans. Instead, a stairwell was constructed on the northwest corner of this extension, fully enclosed with glass and louvres. A northern verandah connected to the verandah of the earlier section, providing access to the stairs and classrooms, and was enclosed with metal-framed fixed glass.

Other changes occurred at the school from the 1950s. In 1954, the school began fundraising for a swimming pool; completed in 1957. In 1960, enrolments peaked at 820 pupils (797 in 2016). Sewerage was connected in 1963 and the toilets were rearranged. During the late 1960s a concrete block retaining wall was built in two sections between the playing field and the school grounds. The large fig tree on the southeastern corner of the grounds appears to have been planted in the early 1960s. A pre-school was built in 1973 and a dental clinic built in 1978. The 1947 male toilet block was substantially altered through its conversion to an art room in 1991.

Changes were made to Block A during 1996–7 including: the replacement of folding partitions on the second floor with steel stud partitions, new windows enclosing the verandahs, the part-removal of verandah walls at the western end of the building, and the part-removal of verandah walls to the easternmost classrooms.

In 2002, the school grounds were extended, with the acquisition of a further 517 square metres (5,560 sq ft) in the northwest corner of the grounds. Multi-purpose court 1 adjacent to the pool is the site of a tennis court built by the school committee in the late 1920s.

Ashgrove State School has commemorated its centenary with a publication in 1977 and its 125th anniversary with a subsequent book in 2002.

In 2018, the school continues to serve the Ashgrove community as it has since 1877; and from 1925 at its current site. In 2018, the school retains its Depression-era brick school (1938, extended 1947 and 1959), the Boulton and Paul building (1953) and its DPW extension (1956), the playing field, levelled by relief workers, set in landscaped grounds. The school community continues its fundraising activities to support the school's educational, social and facilities development as it has done for generations.

== Description ==
Ashgrove State School occupies a 2.805-hectare (6.93-acre) site in Ashgrove, approximately 5.5 km northwest of Brisbane Central Business District (CBD). Facing Glory Street and Waterworks Road to the south, the site is bounded on other sides by Woonga Drive (east); Otonga Road and a residence (north); and a carpark, nature reserve and creek (west).

The school comprises a complex of buildings and structures, the most prominent of which is a Depression-era brick school building (Block A; 1938, extended 1947, and 1959), located in the southwestern corner of the site, addressing Glory Street. It is conspicuous in the area due to its handsome architecture and substantial scale. A Boulton and Paul Prefabricated Building (Block B, 1953, extended 1956 to a Department of Public Works design) is located northwest of Block A. Other important elements of the school include a memorial flagpole (1951) to the southeast of Block A, a playing field at the eastern end of the site and mature shade trees.

=== Depression-era brick school building (Block A) ===
Block A is a substantial masonry structure of two storeys, with an undercroft level. The building has a hip roof clad in terracotta tiles, with a central metal roof fleche. The eaves are lined in sheets and battens with lattice vents. The building comprises a range, running east–west; a short eastern wing projecting to the north (undercroft); and a western extension built in a more contemporary style and aligned with the range. In the centre of the building is an entrance bay (projecting south) and a short wing (projecting north). The entrance bay frames the main entrance to the building and features a pediment and a crosshead over the doorway. An arched window on the second floor is centred with the doorway and the words "ASHGROVE" and "EST 1877" are painted below. Terracotta-tiled window hoods with decorative brackets run the length of the front elevation of the range and shelter the first storey windows. A split stair provides access to the first floor entry foyer within the bay, and a secondary entrance is located at the eastern end of the building, via concrete stairs.

The building is elegantly composed with classical detailing and has rendered decorative elements on the first and second floors. A rendered base forms the undercroft level. The load-bearing walls of the earlier sections are of red-brown face brick with white tuck pointing, and are relieved by brown face brick pilasters and window sill-height rendered string courses. The walls and pilasters of the western extension are rendered (except for a band of face bricks below the first floor window sills; and metal sheet spandrels below the second floor window sills). All pilasters have simple, rendered capitals. Bricks on the northern elevation of the eastern wing are keyed in line with exterior and verandah walls (in anticipation of extension).

The interior layout is generally repeated on the first and second floors, and access to each floor is provided via central, eastern and western concrete stairs that have timber and metal balustrades. On each level, the four earliest classrooms (1938) stand to the east of a central foyer (first floor) and office (second floor). Five classrooms are to the west, with two adjacent to the foyer (1947) of equal size, and the three westernmost (1959) longer. Offices and store rooms are within the central short wing (1947). Most classrooms retain original bulkheads (which indicate the original layout), and lattice ceiling vents are to the 1938 and 1947 sections of the second floor. Most classrooms and offices have plaster walls, timber-framed floors, and sheet and batten ceilings. Skirtings are generally stepped, and most classrooms retain picture rails. Some verandah walls have been removed to increase classroom space; with bulkheads retained.

Verandahs (now enclosed with metal-framed windows) run along the northern side of the building, separating the classrooms from stairs and northern wings. They have polished concrete floors, face brick balustrades, and flat ceilings (with those on the first floor battened).

The undercroft (formerly open play space) is enclosed with modern partitions. It has a concrete slab floor, face brick piers stop-chamfered above head-height (some are rendered), exposed ceiling framing (1938 and 1947 sections) and open-web metal trusses (1959 section). Early toilets are at the eastern and western ends of the building and in the eastern wing; and store rooms are adjacent the central stair. The toilets have plaster and V-jointed (VJ) walls, flat sheet-lined ceilings with rounded cover strips, and VJ timber partitions.

Early timber joinery retained throughout the building includes: casement and awning windows with fanlights to the exterior; double-hung windows with fanlights to the verandah walls; and panelled doors with fanlights. The eastern stair features a large northern screen of fixed and louvered windows. Most windows and doors retain their awning fanlights and early window and door hardware. Folding partitions have been replaced with fixed partitions.

A clear-finished "Honour Board" timber cabinet stands in the corridor of Block A, recording the names of Ashgrove State School scholarship winners from 1939 to 1947. Lettering on the front states it was, "PRESENTED BY A.M. JOLLY. ESQ".

=== Boulton and Paul prefabricated building (Block B) ===
Block B is a long, highset, timber-framed building with a corrugated metal-clad, gable roof that continues over the north-facing verandah. The eastern end, comprising two classrooms, is of a prefabricated Boulton and Paul design (1953) and the western end, also two classrooms, is of similar Department of Works (DPW) design (1956). All classrooms are accessed via the verandah, which has stairs at the eastern ends of both sections. The building is clad in timber chamferboards, including the eastern, western and western half of the southern sides of the understorey. The Boulton and Paul section is clearly distinguishable from the DPW section by its vertical timber strips within the wall lining that define each panel of the prefabricated wall units, timber brackets that support the southern eaves, and the higher window sills to the southern elevation.

The interior layout comprises four classrooms that have flat sheet-lined walls with rounded cover-strips, and flat sheet-lined ceilings. The timber skirtings and cornices are narrow.

The verandah has timber floors, square timber posts, raked ceilings lined in flat sheets with rounded cover strips, and battened timber balustrades. The eastern and western ends have later enclosures that extend classroom space (west) and form a store room (east). Early metal cleats are attached to verandah posts (for blinds now removed).

Large banks of timber-framed awning windows with fanlights are located in the southern wall. The Boulton and Paul section retains an internal timber safety rail and brass window stays. Windows to the verandah wall are timber double-hung window with awning fanlights (Boulton and Paul) and centre-pivoting fanlights (DPW section). Timber-framed windows to the understorey are louvered and fixed. Early timber panelled and French doors are retained.

The understorey is largely open play space and the western end has later enclosures forming store rooms. Posts along the southern side are concrete with rounded corners, those along the northern side are timber, and the remainder are steel. The floor is a concrete slab and timber wall framing is exposed to the interior.

=== Landscape elements ===
The school grounds are well established with mature shade trees, particularly along the site boundaries, and sporting facilities including a generously sized playing field at the eastern end of the site.

The open character of the space between Glory Street and Block A affords views of the building from the street and contributes to the place's prominence and streetscape presence.

A flag pole (1951) is to the south of Block A has a concrete and metal base with a plaque engraved with the words "IN COMMEMORATION OF JUBILEE YEAR 1951".

== Heritage listing ==
Ashgrove State School was listed on the Queensland Heritage Register on 24 April 2018 having satisfied the following criteria.

The place is important in demonstrating the evolution or pattern of Queensland's history.

Ashgrove State School (established in 1876) is important in demonstrating the evolution of state education and its associated architecture in Queensland. The place retains excellent, representative examples of standard government-designs that were an architectural responses to prevailing government educational philosophies, set in landscaped grounds, assembly, play and sports areas.

The Depression-era brick school building (1938) and the initial formation of the school playing field, are a result of the Queensland Government's building and relief work programs during the 1930s that stimulated the economy and provided work for men unemployed as a result of the Great Depression. Extensions made to the building in 1947 and 1959 comply with the intended original plan. The 1959 extension reflects a later educational philosophy and architectural style demonstrated in larger classroom size and increased natural light and ventilation.

The Boulton & Paul Building (1953) demonstrates the introduction and adoption of imported prefabricated systems by the Queensland Government in response to acute building material shortages and population growth during the post-WWII period. The Department of Public Works-designed (DPW) extension (1956) demonstrates the influence of Boulton & Paul buildings on subsequent Department of Public Works school designs.

The place is important in demonstrating the principal characteristics of a particular class of cultural places.

Ashgrove State School is important in demonstrating the principal characteristics of early to mid-20th century Queensland state schools. These include: teaching buildings constructed to standard designs by the Queensland Government Department of Public Works (DPW); and generous landscaped grounds, shade trees, assembly and play areas and sporting facilities. The school is a good, intact example of a suburban school complex, comprising a Depression-era brick school building and a Boulton & Paul Building, both with Department of Public Works-designed extensions.

The Depression-era brick school building is an excellent, substantial, and intact example of its type, demonstrating the principal characteristics, which include: a handsome edifice standing at the front of the school; symmetrical two-storey form of classrooms and teachers rooms above an undercroft of open play spaces; a linear layout of the main floors with rooms accessed by corridors; loadbearing masonry construction; prominent central entrance bay, and high-quality design to provide superior educational environments that focus on abundant natural light and ventilation. It demonstrates the use of stylistic features of its era, which determined its roof form, joinery, and decorative treatment. Its 1959 western extension demonstrates a re-interpretation of the 1937 design to meet standards of the time.

The Boulton & Paul Prefabricated Building (1953) is a good, intact example of this standard type. It is important in demonstrating the principal characteristics through: the expression of its modular prefabricated construction in the external cladding; its timber-framed, lightweight construction; one-storey, highset, gable-roofed form with open play space underneath; open verandah for circulation; classrooms (24'x24'), flat internal wall linings; and large banks of lowset timber-framed windows in opposing external classroom walls with their distinctive fall-prevention bar and window stays.

Influenced by the Boulton & Paul type, the DPW-designed extension (1956) is a good, intact example of its standard type, demonstrating the principal characteristics including its: timber-framed, lightweight construction; one-storey, highset, gable-roofed form with open play space underneath; full-height timber verandah posts running from ground level to the eaves; open verandah for circulation; classrooms (24'x24'), flat internal wall linings; and large banks of timber-framed awning and double-hung windows in opposing external classroom walls.

The place is important because of its aesthetic significance.

Through its conspicuous position at the front of the school, substantial size and height, materials, symmetry, elegant composition, restrained use of decoration, and fine craftsmanship, the Depression-era brick school building has aesthetic significance due to its expressive attributes, by which the Department of Public Works sought to convey the concepts of progress and permanence.

The building is also significant for its streetscape contribution. Framed by mature trees, it is an attractive and prominent feature of the area.

The place has a strong or special association with a particular community or cultural group for social, cultural or spiritual reasons.

Schools have always played an important part in Queensland communities. They typically retain significant and enduring connections with former pupils, parents, and teachers; provide a venue for social interaction and volunteer work; and are a source of pride, symbolising local progress and aspirations.

Ashgrove State School has a strong and ongoing association with the community. It was established in 1876 through the fundraising efforts of the local community, with generations of Ashgrove children taught at this school. Relocated in 1925 and the new grounds established through community support, the place is important for its contribution to the educational development of Ashgrove and is a prominent community focal point.

== See also ==
- History of state education in Queensland
