= Woodlands, Ashgrove =

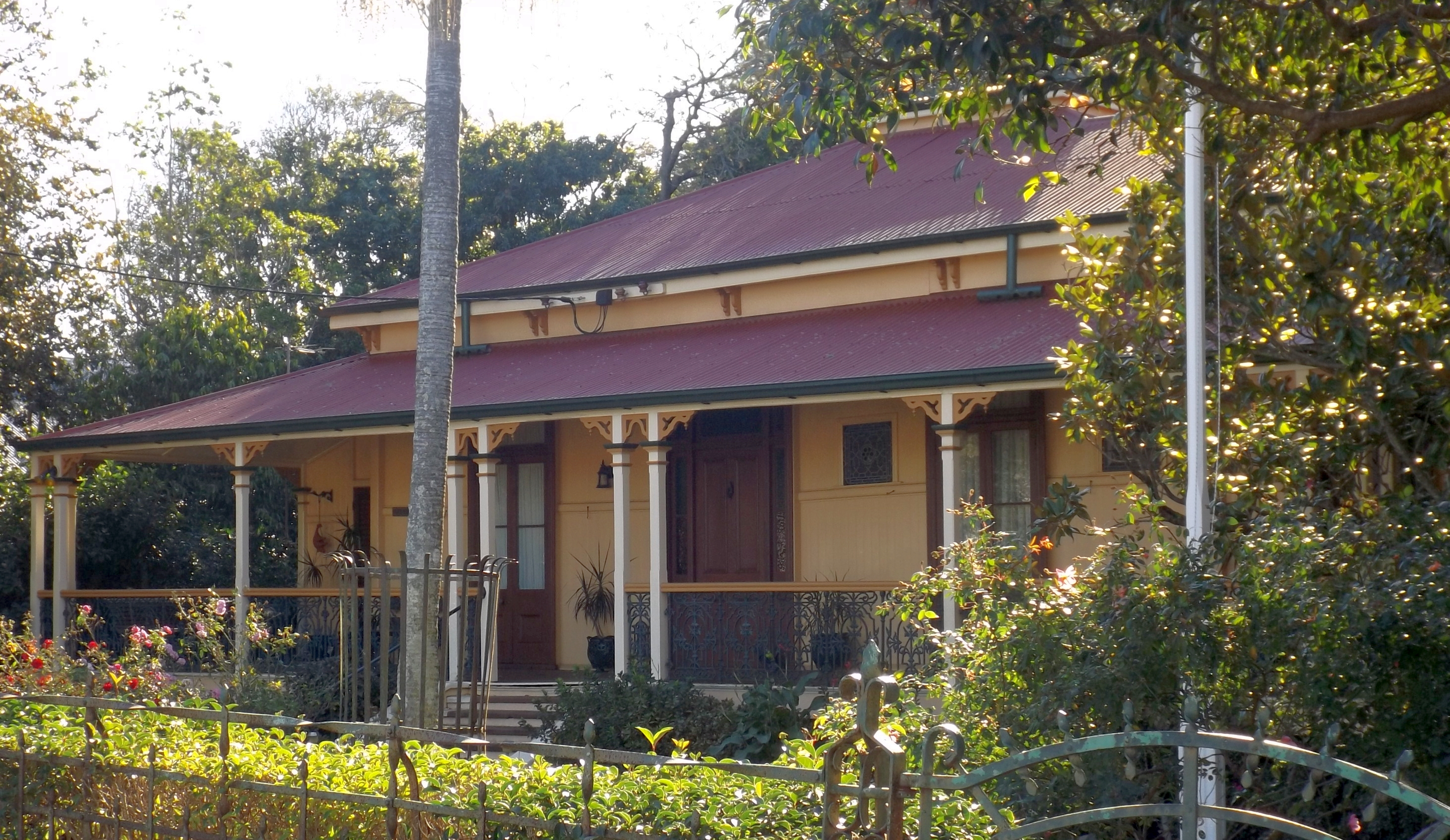
- Residence in 2015

- Location within Queensland Location within Australia
- 27.4446°S 152.998°E
- Location: 24 Woodland Street, Ashgrove, City of Brisbane, Queensland, Australia

History
- Design period: 1870s–1890s (late 19th century)
- Built: 1880s–1930s

Queensland Heritage Register
- Official name: Woodlands, Clarke's Farm, Glen Urquhart
- Type: state heritage (built, landscape)
- Designated: 4 August 1997
- Reference no.: 601890
- Significant period: 1880s–1930s (fabric); 1880s, 1920s– (historical)
- Significant components: garden/grounds, trees/plantings, residential accommodation – main house, fence/wall – perimeter, furniture/fittings, extension/s or addition/s, gate – entrance

Woodlands is a heritage-listed detached house at 24 Woodland Street, Ashgrove, City of Brisbane, Queensland, Australia. It was built from 1880s to 1930s. It is also known as Clarke's Farm and Glen Urquhart. It was added to the Queensland Heritage Register on 4 August 1997.

== History ==
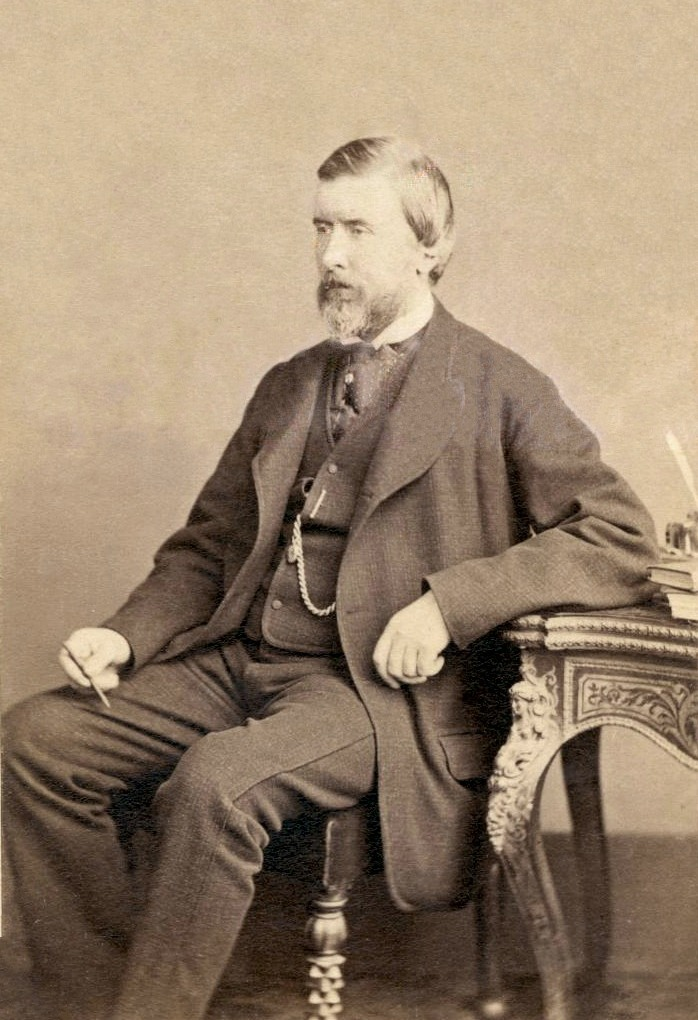
Professor John Henry Pepper

Woodlands is situated on part of the 30 acres of land originally purchased in 1868 by James Clarke and known as Clarke's Farm. From at least 1882 Clarke and a William Reinhold prospected for gold on the property. In 1883, the land, together with a small house and outbuildings, was sold to William Widdop, although Clarke and Reinhold continued their activities. In the same year, Professor John Henry Pepper leased the property for himself and his family. Pepper, an analytical chemist, also had an interest in other branches of the sciences, particularly the application of electricity. He had arrived in Brisbane in 1881 after gaining a name in his native England and abroad as an educator and populariser of science and for introducing evening classes to the London Polytechnic. He gave lectures and staged entertaining demonstrations including the famous illusion named Pepper's ghost. In Brisbane, he gave early demonstrations of electric light and of the gramophone as well as setting up courses in science at schools and introducing chemistry classes at the School of Arts. He also opened a laboratory in Queen Street as a consulting analytical chemist. He is credited with the first formal teaching of chemistry in Queensland.

Following an agreement made in 1883 with Widdop, who agreed to sell the property to Pepper if no payable gold was found, Pepper erected a house on the property, which is now known as "Woodlands". In 1886 this agreement became the subject of a legal dispute that was settled in favour of Pepper, who then purchased the land. In 1889 he sold the property to Charles Plant and returned to England.

Plant, who had extensive gold mining interests in north Queensland, including the Venus Battery, used the property to stay at when in Brisbane until he retired there in 1897/8 for the benefit of his children's education. About this time he erected a grand house for himself, adjacent to Pepper's house, which he named "Ferndale" and erected a decorative wrought iron fence along Woodland Street that enclosed both houses.

Pepper's former house was rented out until 1922, when the land was subdivided in anticipation of the marriage of Plant's elder daughter, Hilda. The house and land were placed in the name of her fiancé, John MacDonald Grant, who had been in military service at Gallipoli and in France with Eric and Reg Plant, two of Hilda's brothers.

In the same year, Plant made a similar provision for his other daughter, Oenone, transferring land between the former Pepper house and Ferndale to her future husband, John Finlay. This land was not built on however, and was used until the 1950s as an extension to the garden of the Grant's home, which they called Glen Urquhart. In 1933 a new room in the current, Art Deco style was added to the south east corner of the house by architects Addison and MacDonald.

In 1932 Charles Plant died and in 1936 the land on which Ferndale stood was subdivided and the house was demolished. It had featured handsome carved cedar joinery and a ballroom surmounted by a lantern decorated with leadlight panels. These panels and some decorative joinery were then incorporated into the Grant home.

Hilda Grant died in 1943 after prolonged ill health. She had been deeply involved with the Australian Red Cross in both World Wars, being President of the Ashgrove Branch in World War II and Convenor of the Ithaca Branch of the Australian Comforts Fund. She was also commissioner for Girl Guides in the 1930s. John Grant lived until the age of 94, dying in 1977. Although he was trained as an engineer, becoming Chief Assistant Engineer for Brisbane Tramways, he retained his military associations after World War I. In 1938 he was appointed to command and raise the 61st Battalion of the Queensland Cameron Highlanders, which he did with notable success. They were later to play a significant role in the Battle of Milne Bay in 1942. Grant was also inaugural president of the Ashgrove RSL. During his presidency between 1932 and 1935, committee meetings were held at his home. Woodland Street remains the official Ashgrove marshalling area on Anzac Day, a reminder of Grant's early role in organising Anzac Day observances in the area. Following his death, the land accompanying the house was subdivided into two blocks. Lot No. 2 on which the house is located was purchased by its present owners, Mrs Janet and Major Austin Hogan in 1979 and named "Woodlands" the house having no name.

Mrs Janet Hogan is a recognised author on Queensland's heritage and is well known for her work in furthering an awareness of the State's heritage, especially the built environment. In co-operation with newspapers, magazines and television stations, she has worked on the production of many educational programmes. Mrs Janet and Major Austin have both played integral roles in the National Trust of Queensland and in recognition of their work, they have both been awarded Honorary Life Membership of the National Trust.

== Description ==
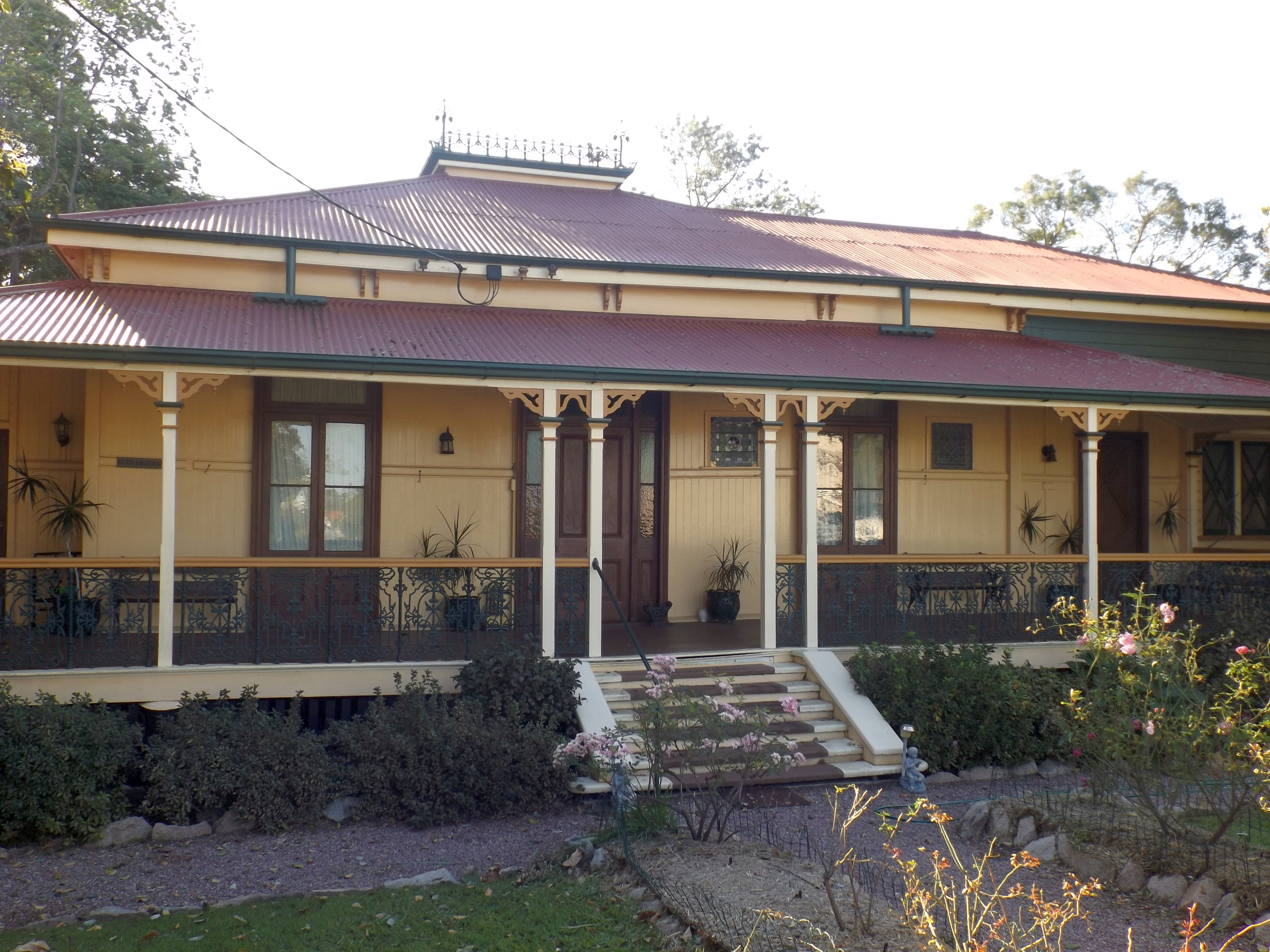
Entrance, 2015

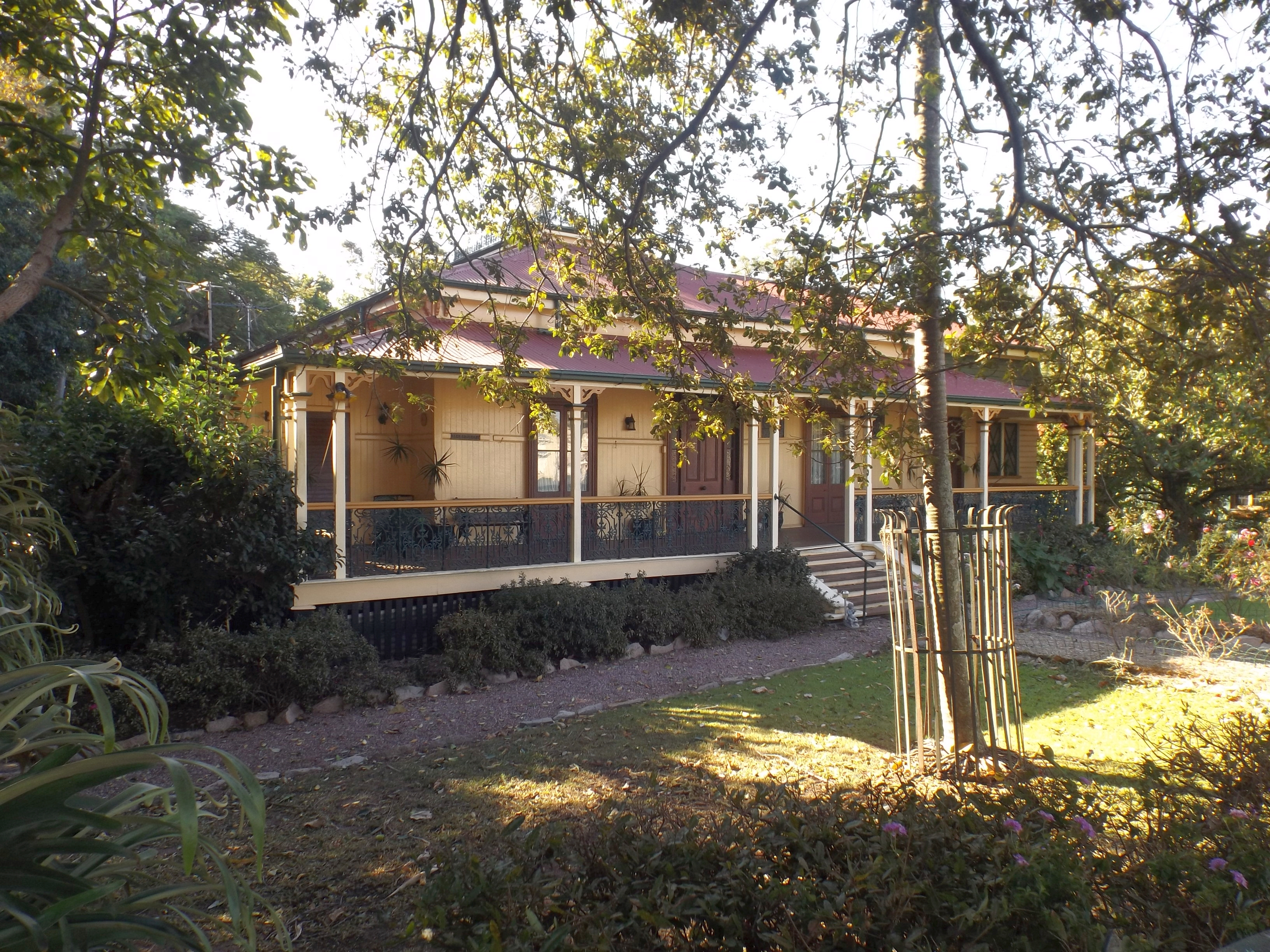
Front garden, 2015

Woodlands is today situated on half an acre of land. The garden contains large mature trees, including a weeping fig, silky oaks, jacarandas, poincianas, Moreton Bay chestnuts, casuarinas, pines, flame trees and an albizia. It has a privet hedge along the front fence dating from at least the 1920s. A decorative wrought iron fence, gates and matching tree guards, constructed of Lowmoor iron and marked Baleys Patent Albion, survive from Charles Plant's time.

The house is a single storey, timber building on stumps, low set at the front and high at the back where the land falls away to the former mining gully. The main, 1883 section is roughly square in plan, with walls of single skin, vertical beaded tongue and groove boards on a hardwood frame that has pegged tenoned joints visible at external door heads and windows. The roof is clad with corrugated iron. It has six main rooms with front and back hallways leading into the dining room. The joinery is cedar and the large cedar fireplace remains in the dining room. There are timber fretwork roses in the twelve foot ceilings. Cedar French doors with fanlights open onto the formerly encircling verandahs. The hall/dining room doors have etched and coloured glass panels in the upper sections. The leadlights believed to have been transferred from Ferndale have distinctive geometric patterns and have been incorporated as decorative features in internal and external walls and some fanlights. Wall panels are generally accompanied by elaborately carved cedar shelf/brackets, believed also to come from Ferndale.

Externally, the "new room" added in 1933 sits comfortably at the corner of the house but has some distinctive details, in particular the concave sweep between the upper eaves and verandah roof levels of the original house, the sweep being clad with cedar shingles. Internally it has a plaster "art deco" ceiling, silky oak joinery and panelling, including panelled doors with crossed diagonal decorative mouldings. The diagonal cross design is repeated in the casement windows and in the fixed and sliding leadlight panels that replaced the wall dividing this room from the drawing room. The adjoining verandah, now a breakfast room has cedar bi-fold windows that match the design of the casements in the "new room". There is a fireplace for an electric fire that survives. Some modernisation also carried out in other rooms at the time, includes the installation of a matching fireplace in the drawing room and its Art Deco green tiling, a terrazzo hearth and a green enamel stove in the original brick stove recess of the kitchen.

The house retains its 1930s form, together with a high degree of intact detail, including door furniture and the remains of gas lighting in the bedrooms. The bedrooms also have built-in hand basins set in timber beaded cupboards.

== Heritage listing ==
Woodlands was listed on the Queensland Heritage Register on 4 August 1997 having satisfied the following criteria.

The place is important in demonstrating the evolution or pattern of Queensland's history.

Constructed in 1883, Woodlands and its grounds are important for the evidence they provide of the way of life of prosperous citizens in the outer reaches of Brisbane in the late nineteenth century.

The place is important in demonstrating the principal characteristics of a particular class of cultural places.

The house is important as an example of a fine quality 1880s residence that is substantially intact, both internally and externally. The grounds and gardens, which contain mature plantings including several specimen trees, an early privet hedge and rare surviving ironwork fence and gates, contribute to the overall integrity of the property.

The place is important because of its aesthetic significance.

The fine quality of interior finishes and fixtures, which include extensive decorative cedar joinery and leadlight panels give Woodlands considerable aesthetic significance. The large room, which was added in 1933, is of interest as an unusual and intact example of an Art Deco style interior incorporating extensive timber panelling and strong diagonal cross designs for the windows, doors and screens.

The place has a special association with the life or work of a particular person, group or organisation of importance in Queensland's history.

Woodlands, is important for its association with several notable owners who have contributed to the development of Queensland in the fields of education, mining, defence, community service and the heritage conservation movement. For their work in furthering an awareness of the State's heritage, Mrs Janet and Major Austin Hogan are particularly noted.

== See also ==
- Woodlands, Marburg, another Queensland Heritage-listed historic house also near Brisbane
