= St John's Wood House, Ashgrove =

St John's Wood residence, Ashgrove
- Location within Queensland Location within Australia
- 27.4459°S 152.9723°E
- Location: 31 Piddington Street, Ashgrove, City of Brisbane, Queensland, Australia

History
- Design period: 1840s–1860s (mid-19th century)
- Built: 1864–c. 1900

Queensland Heritage Register
- Official name: St John's Wood, Granite House
- Type: state heritage (landscape, built)
- Designated: 23 June 2000
- Reference no.: 601506
- Significant period: 1860s–1900s (fabric, historical)
- Significant components: skylight/s, roof lantern / lantern light, trees/plantings, garden/grounds, residential accommodation – main house, ballroom

St Johns Wood is a heritage-listed villa at 31 Piddington Street, Ashgrove, City of Brisbane, Queensland, Australia. It was built from 1864 to c. 1900. It is also known as Granite House. It was added to the Queensland Heritage Register on 23 June 2000. The present day neighbourhood of St Johns Wood takes its name from this early house.

== History ==
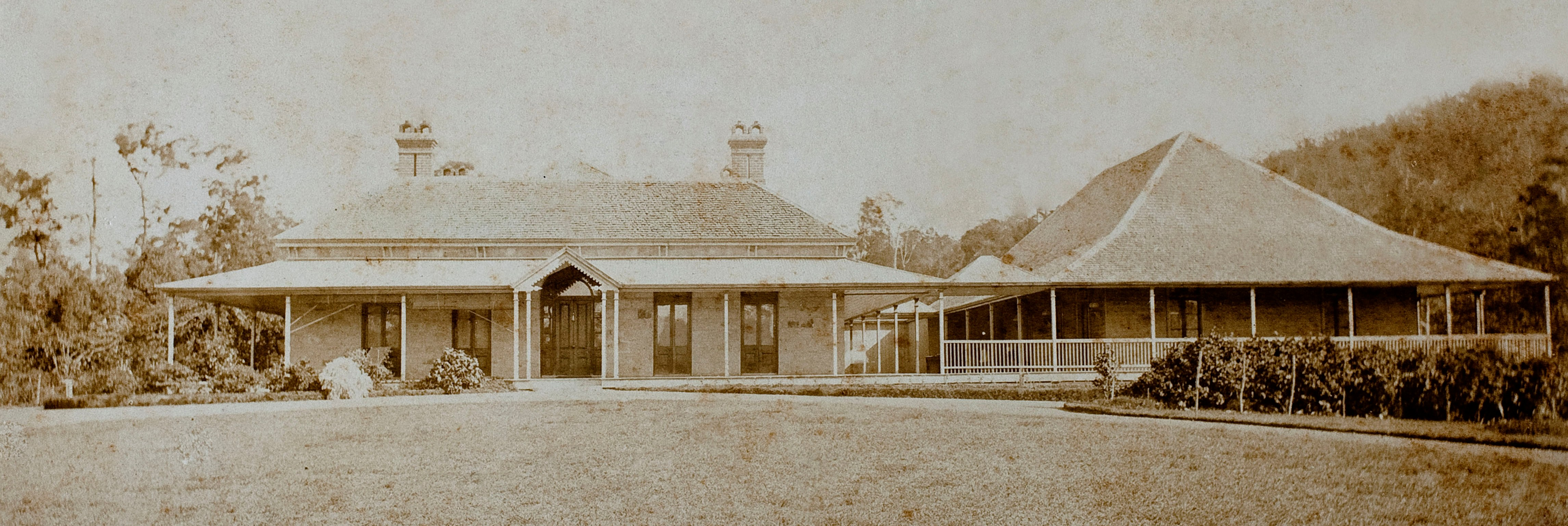
Granite House with Cedar House, right. 1880

St John's Wood, a single storey residence, primarily built of local granite, was constructed in the mid-1860s for Daniel Rowntree Somerset. The neighbourhood of St John's Wood in Ashgrove is named after the house.

Free settlement occurred in Brisbane, traditional country of the Yuggera and Turrbal people, from 1842. Land available for private ownership was progressively surveyed and offered for sale by the New South Wales government. Land was categorized as either "town", within gazetted towns and villages, "suburban", within 5 miles (8.0 km) of town boundaries or "country", beyond this radius. Early settlement was largely focussed on town land on opposite sides of the river at North Brisbane and South Brisbane, while suburban areas developed more slowly.

The area that is now the suburb of Ashgrove was known as "Kallindarbin" by the Turrbal people. From at least the 1850s, the land was on which St John's Wood is located was contained within a large pastoral lease holding. The Gap pastoral station, watered by Enoggera Creek and extending west towards the Taylor Range, was taken up by Darby McGrath in 1851 to run sheep. At the second freehold sale of portions of this land in 1858, prominent pastoralist (later inaugural Member of the Queensland Legislative Council) John Frederick McDougall purchased Portion 164 and 165, an area of 12 hectares and 21 hectares. By the following year McDougall was the major landholder along Enoggera Creek and remained owner of Portions 164 and 165 until they passed to auctioneer Arthur Martin in 1863.

Daniel Rowntree Somerset acquired Portions 164 and 165 and in 1867, portion 381. The latter two portions became the suburb of St John's Wood. Originally from Northern Ireland, Somerset arrived in Brisbane with his wife Dora and three children in 1850. For much of the 1850s he was a general merchant in partnership with John Richardson and was prominent in civic affairs, including the push for Separation of Queensland from New South Wales. In December 1859, he was appointed Chief Clerk and Shipping Master of the Port of Brisbane, a post he held until his retirement in 1876.

The first half of the 1860s was a period of strong growth for Brisbane in the newly established colony of Queensland. Immigration boosted the population dramatically (more than doubling between 1861 and 1864 to over 12,000) and many substantial public and private buildings were constructed during this time. The urban environment of Brisbane's fledgling town centre, where residential dwellings co-existed in close proximity with commercial and industrial activity, was characterised by congestion, noise, and poor sanitation, common among other developing towns and cities in mid-19th century Australia. During this period "villa estates", located in the suburban periphery in then semi-rural settings – on elevated locations such as along ridgelines, and in some instances with river frontage – became an increasingly popular type of dwelling for Brisbane's more affluent residents. This demographic included the likes of higher ranking public servants, professionals and successful business people. The flight to residential villa estates by the well-to-do was a development pattern that occurred internationally during the Victorian era. Key elements of villa estates included large and comfortable houses, associated outbuildings such as servant's quarters and stabling, expansive garden settings, and a good road to town.

In March 1865, the Brisbane Courier noted, "substantial brick villas, instead of wooden houses are on the increase". A later article in September stated, "numerous villa residences have been erected during the past 12 months in the suburbs of the town. No greater proof of the prosperity of a city as a whole can be afforded than that derived from the disposition of its citizens to plant and build on its environs, and to make it their home socially as well as professionally. Scarcely a day passes but our advertising columns invite tenders for the erection of villa residences".

Sometime after acquiring the property, Somerset commissioned the construction of a residence. The designer and builder of the residence are unconfirmed. Joshua Jeays, a prominent Brisbane contractor, who designed and built the nearby villa Bardon House in 1863, has previously been linked to St. John's Wood but no firm evidence to support this has been identified. It is not known if any buildings or structures were already on Somerset's property, but highly unlikely as the purchase price was £450

The house was a single storey building with a formal symmetrical U-shaped plan, featuring substantial walls constructed of Enoggera granite, by the working to size of the exposed rocks on the nearby hillside. The Somersets occupied the house for only a short time. Dora Somerset died in February 1867, with her death notice indicating the residence was known by this time as St. John's Wood. The following month Daniel Somerset advertised the property for sale or let, describing the residence as "a substantial and well-finished Stone Dwelling House of eight rooms, and the necessary outbuildings, all in a state of thorough repair, and suitable for a respectable family". Somerset was still at St John's Wood in May 1868 when his eldest daughter Anna was married there. Shortly after, in June 1868, the house was leased to George Rogers Harding.

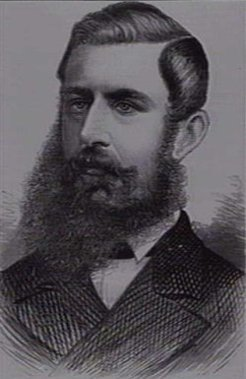
George Rogers Harding

George Rogers Harding was born on 3 December 1838 at Taunton, Somerset, England and undertook his legal training prior to immigrating to Australia. Harding and his wife Emily (née Morris) arrived in Brisbane in 1866 with their three daughters and servant. He was admitted to the Bar shortly after arrival, as the first equity counsel in the colony. In July 1879 he became senior puisne judge of the Supreme Court of Queensland. Over the course of his career, Harding was respected for his "scrupulously fair" judgements, except when his harsh sentences for unionists convicted during the conspiracy trial after the 1891 shearer's strike made him unpopular. Author of six legal books and a noted bibliophile, Harding played a large part in establishing the Supreme Court's library. Harding married Isabella Grahame on 23 December 1889 following Emily's death in May of that year.

In 1874, Harding became the owner of the property, residing at St John's Wood with his family for another two decades. It was in 1874 that Ash-grove, the name of the future suburb, first appears, as Harding's address in the Post Office Directory. A keen property speculator, over time Harding extended the estate to include an area from Bailey's Quarry to Betheden at Ashgrove and from Sir Charles Lilley's Quarry to Glen Lyon Estate. Harding donated 2 acres (0.81 hectares) of land on Waterworks Road in 1876 to establish the Ashgrove Provisional School (now Ashgrove State School).

In June 1877 architect Richard Gailey called tenders for alterations and additions to Harding's residence. Part of the additions included a ballroom, created by infilling the space (in brick) between the two wings of the house. The need for extra space at St John's Wood was influenced by the size of the Harding family; of 15 children born, 12 survived George and Emily. Next to the main house was another large building, mostly of cedar, with a shingled roof and 10 rooms. The designer and date of construction of this building (later referred to as the "Cedar House" to differentiate from the "Granite House") is unknown; the first evidence of its existence is an 1880s photograph of St John's Wood. This building was moved to a new site in 1926 and burnt down shortly after.

Over the course of the Hardings' occupancy other improvements occurred at the property including an access road to the property and stabling. Part of the estate, on the other side of Waterworks Road, near the present Orchard Avenue, was the site of a citrus orchard, thought to have been cared for by the important botanist Frederick Manson Bailey. Some sources have stated the orchard was 10 acres (4.05 hectares), but in 1877 Harding advertised for sale by auction the "Ashgrove Orangery", a 37-acre (15.18 ha) orchard featuring 900 citrus trees "just coming into fruit".

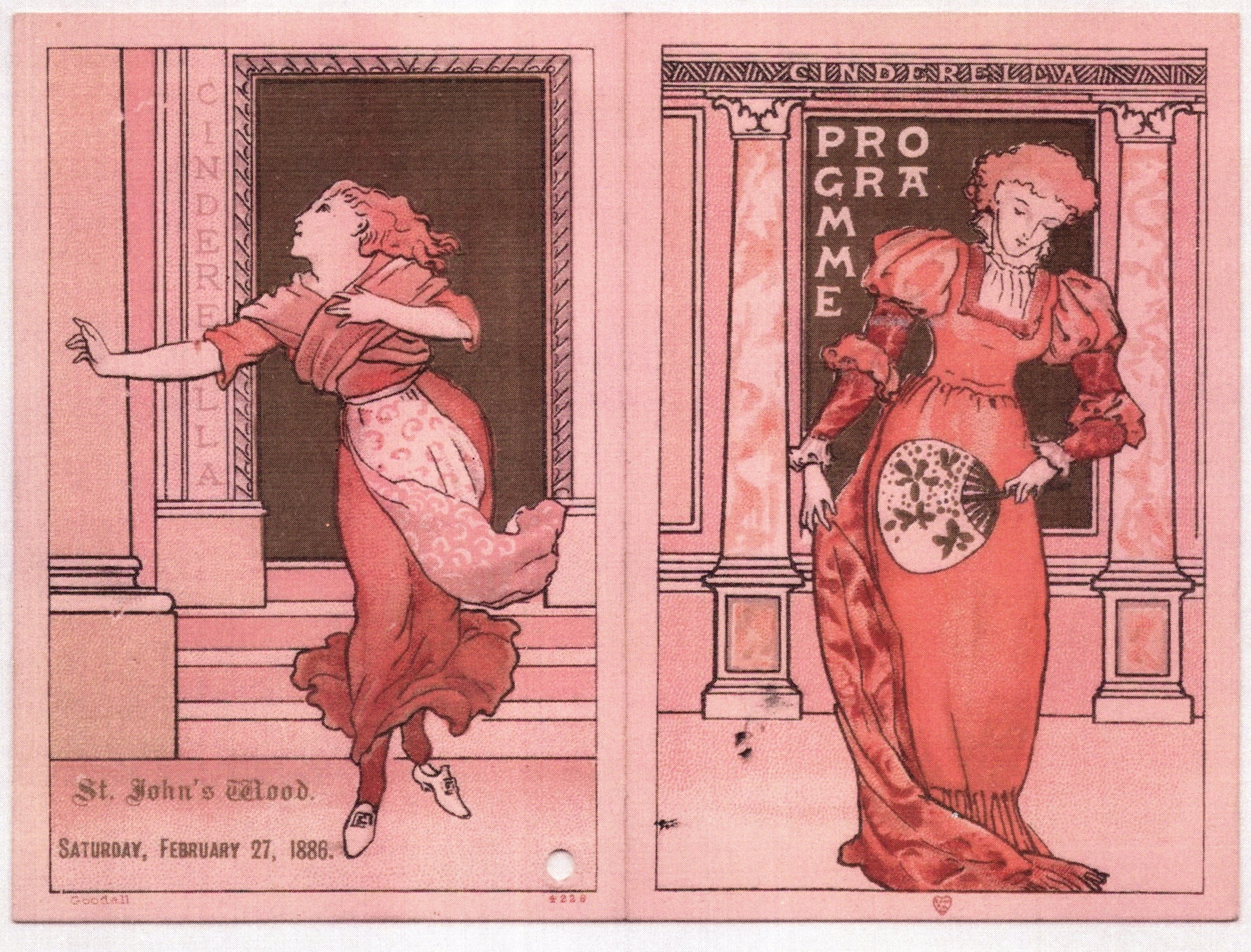
St. John's Wood Dance Card 1886

St John's Wood became renowned for its gatherings, with Harding "having taken a leading part in the social life of Brisbane". Events were often reported in the social columns of Brisbane's newspapers and according to Sir Charles Lilley, the house was "always a popular place with the younger folk in the ordinary rounds of social entertainment". An oft-repeated claim is that Prince Albert and Prince George (later George V) spent time at St John's Wood in 1881, due to Harding's friendship with the Prince of Wales, Edward II. Contemporary reports extensively covered their busy three-day schedule and while they did attend a ministerial picnic at the Enoggera Waterworks (and thus had an opportunity to visit riding there and back) there is no record of any time spent at St John's Wood. A later visit by George V and his wife Mary in 1901 during their Federation tour is even more unlikely, as no Hardings resided at St John's Wood by this time. The stories of the royal visits appear to have been a way of marketing Francis Anglim's "high class suburb", when the property was subdivided in the 1920s (see below).

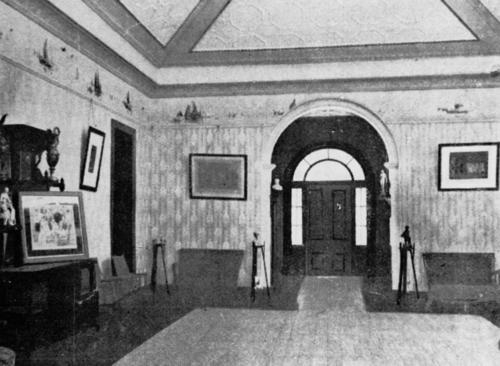
Interior of Granite House at St. John's Wood, Brisbane, 1924

George Harding died in August 1895. He died intestate and had amassed considerable debt through his property speculation. In the months after his death, the household furniture and effects of St John's Wood were sold off, "the result of good taste and the accumulation of a lifetime". An auction catalogue of Harding's effects described St John's Wood as containing a drawing room, dining room, large hall, smaller hall, library, "best" bedroom, dressing room, bachelor's room, seven other bedrooms, pantry, lumber room, two servants rooms, kitchen laundry and stables. This extensive list suggests the Cedar House and other buildings were included in this description. Part of a building that originally extended from the rear of the main building (to the west), thought to have been the servant's quarters and kitchen/laundry, survives on the adjacent property.

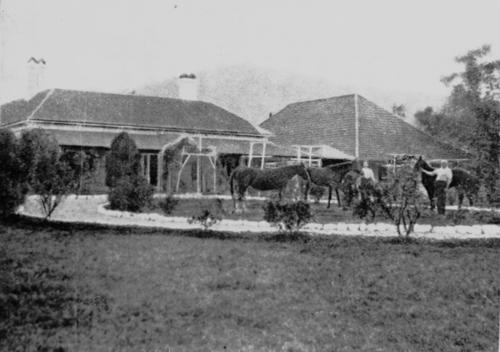
Granite House, St Johns Wood 1924

The Hardings' link to St John's Wood ended by July 1896, when the property was advertised to let, "one of the most complete and best appointed properties in the colony". In 1898 ownership of the land passed from administrators of Harding's estate, the Union Trustee Company of Australia, to the Queensland National Bank. In subsequent years St John's Wood was advertised to let a number of times and for auction in 1912. Little is known about the occupancy of the place during this period. Post Office Directories record James Pitkeathly at St Johns Wood from 1906 to 1910–11; the 1908 entry mentions a dairy, so this may have been how the land was being used at the time. In 1910 and 1911, scout troops conducted activities, including camping and cooking competitions, on the property. In 1914, advertisements for the sale of thoroughbred horses at St Johns Wood appear. Francis Michael Anglim, who became owner of the property in 1917, was a thoroughbred horse breeder. His name appears in relation to St John's Wood in 1915, so it is possible he may have been renting the property earlier. Anglim's 1931 obituary states he resided at St John's Wood for 21 years (from 1910). War-related fundraising functions were held at St John's Wood in 1915, but the resident of the house is not identified in reports of these events.

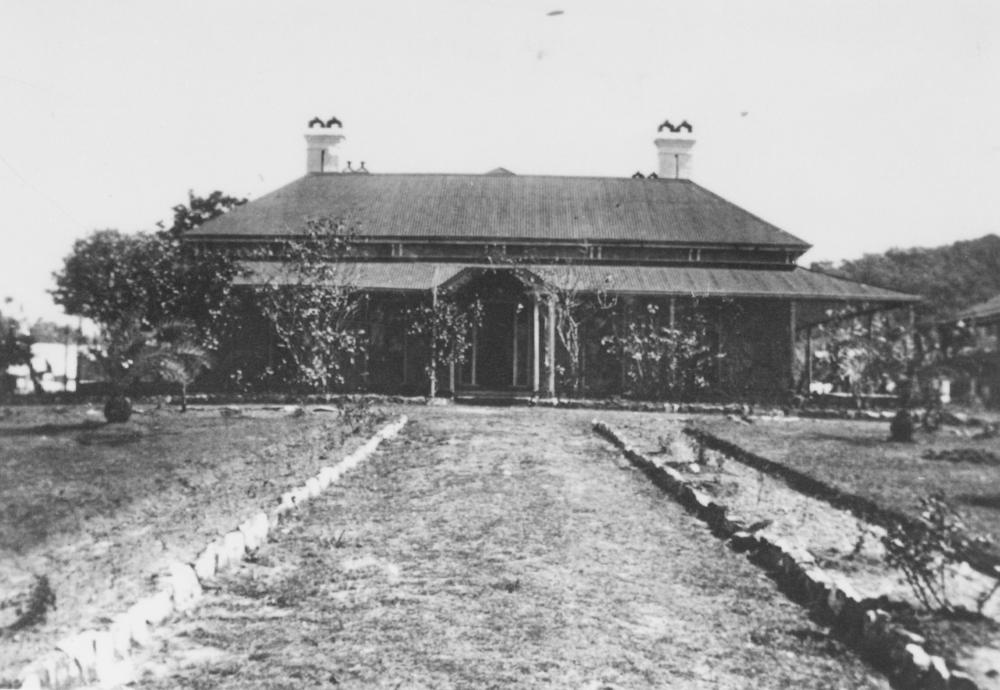
Gravel drive up to the front of St John's Wood in Ashgrove Brisbane

In the 1920s, the suburb of Ashgrove underwent rapid development. Until this time, the area was still fairly sparsely settled in comparison with suburbs closer to the city. The extension of the tramline in 1924 led to a number of subdivisions of large landholdings for housing. This included Glen Lyon Gardens, Oakleigh and Graham estates, and St John's Wood. St John's Wood was advertised by Anglim as a housing estate from 1924, "good enough for His Majesty the King". With 244 lots subdivided by 1926, the area surrounding the house was reduced to just over 1 acre (0.51 hectares).

By 1950 the original building had been converted into flats and in 1958 the lot was further subdivided, which reoriented property frontage and access from Laird Street to Piddington Street. When Jules and Judithann Guerassimoff purchased the house in 1968, the 92 metres (302 ft) of continuous verandah had been partially enclosed and the former ballroom was in use as a workshop. During their ownership some restoration work occurred at the house, which included returning the place to a single residence. St John's Wood was purchased by new owners in 1987 who still occupy the house in 2014.

== Description ==
St John's Wood is a single storey residence, square in plan and built of granite with a hipped roof originally sheeted with timber shingles, now replaced with corrugated iron. It is surrounded on all sides by verandahs supported by timber posts. The four brick chimneys have brick string courses and caps.

An entrance in the eastern facade is centrally located under a projecting portico with gable. The pediment has understated timber detailing and is supported by three verandah posts on each side. This was originally the front entrance. The cedar double paneled door has glazed sidelights and a semi-circular fanlight. The southern side of the house has now become the street frontage. French doors open onto the verandahs from all major rooms except the ballroom.

Internally, the front door opens into an entrance hall which opens to the ballroom, the principal room in the house. The ballroom is lit by a skylight set into a rectangular roof lantern. The ballroom is surrounded by the remainder of the house. Pressed metal ceilings feature throughout the house and are emphasised by the height of the ceilings and the polished timber floors. Detailing is fine with extensive cedar joinery and marble fireplaces to the main bedroom, living and dining rooms

To either side of the entrance hall are two equally proportioned rooms. The remaining rooms open from the ballroom. The southern wing contains the dining and the modern kitchen. The northern wing houses two bedrooms, one of which contains an ensuite bathroom. To the south a modern brick laundry and guesthouse are connected to the house by a covered walkway. The remaining garden and mature trees provide a pleasant and private setting for the house.

== Heritage listing ==
St John's Wood was listed on the Queensland Heritage Register on 23 June 2000 having satisfied the following criteria.

The place is important in demonstrating the evolution or pattern of Queensland's history.

St John's Wood, the first major house in the suburb of St John's Wood, gave the suburb its name, and plays a key role in demonstrating the pattern of settlement and growth of Brisbane's north-western suburbs.

The place demonstrates rare, uncommon or endangered aspects of Queensland's cultural heritage.

St John's Wood is significant for its rarity because it is an 1860s house built primarily of granite quarried in the vicinity.

The place is important in demonstrating the principal characteristics of a particular class of cultural places.

The 1860s stone residence is significant for its aesthetic quality, craftsmanship and intactness, including the internal cedar joinery, skylight, pressed metal ceilings throughout, stonework and original beech floors. The house and grounds are significant also for their landmark quality.

The place is important because of its aesthetic significance.

The 1860s stone residence is significant for its aesthetic quality, craftsmanship and intactness, including the internal cedar joinery, skylight, plaster ceiling roses, stonework and original beech floors. The house and grounds are significant also for their landmark quality.
