= St Johns Wood, Queensland =

St Johns Wood
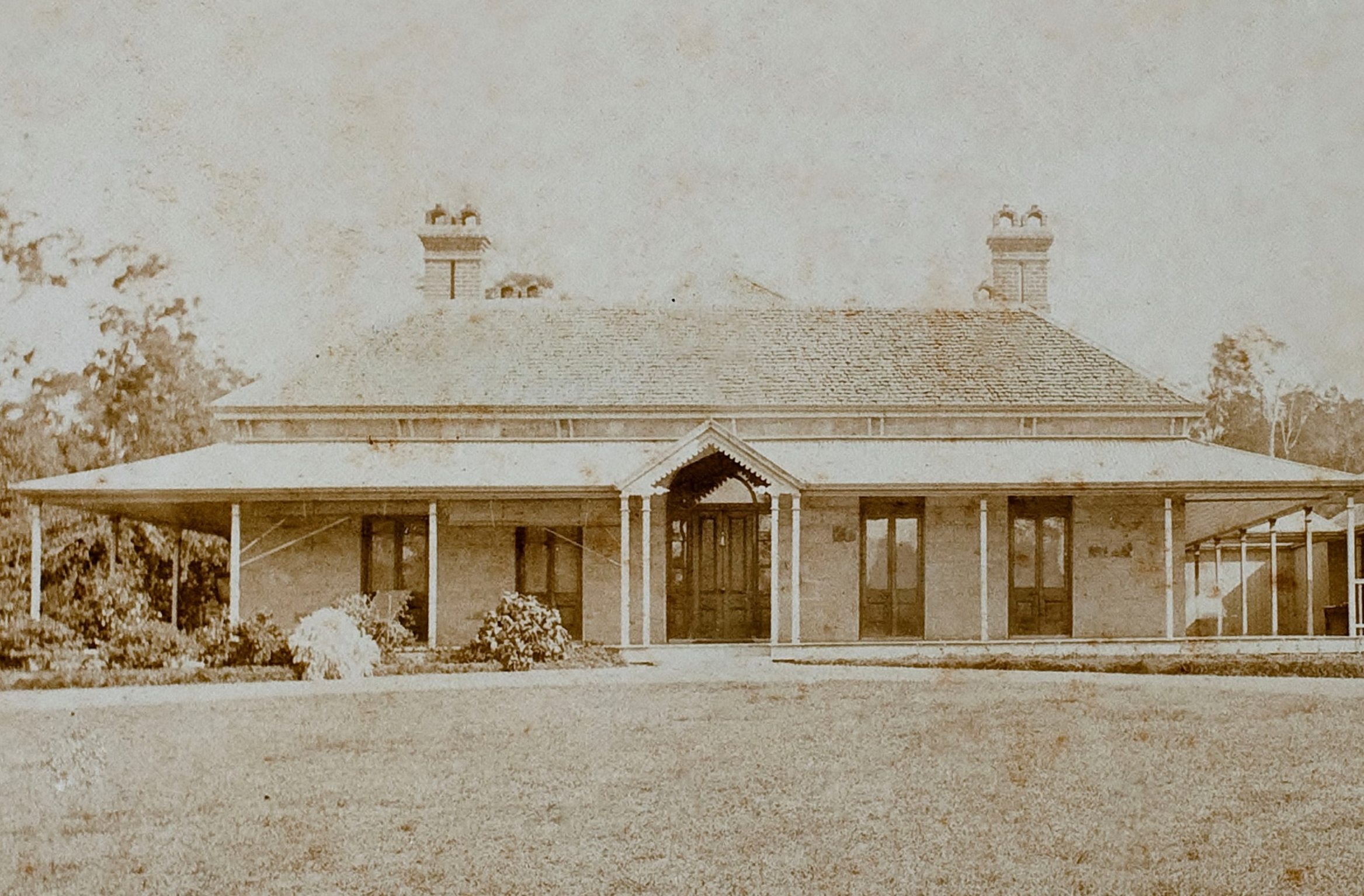
- Granite House, St. John's Wood 1880

- Coordinates: 27°26′00″S 152°58′00″E
- Country: Australia
- State: Queensland
- Region: South East Queensland
- City: Brisbane
- LGA: City of Brisbane, The Gap Ward
- Location: 7.8 km (4.8 mi) NW of Brisbane CBD
- Established: 1858

Government
  - State electorate: Cooper
  - Federal division: Brisbane
- Time zone: UTC+10 (AEST)
- Postcode: 4060
- County: Stanley
- Parish: Enoggera
Localities around St Johns Wood
Keperra	Enoggera, Mitchelton	Alderley
The Gap	St Johns Wood	Newmarket
Mount Coot-tha	Bardon	Ashgrove

St Johns Wood is a neighbourhood within the suburb of Ashgrove in the City of Brisbane, Queensland, Australia.

A small residential pocket at the base of Taylor Range, it is embraced by a loop of Enoggera Creek and by the Ashgrove Golf Club, Brisbane City Council Reserve and the Enoggera Barracks. The locality was originally inhabited by the Indigenous Turrbal people before it opened up to European settlement during the second land-sales of the district in 1858, with the homestead called St John's Wood House (also known as Granite House) founded in 1864. It remains and occupies a small parcel of land within the locality, with the remainder being subdivided into housing allotments. Additionally, it is home to St Johns Wood Scout Group and The Woods Early Education Centre & Pre-school. The neighbourhood is accessed by either vehicular bridge, bikepath or footbridge. A prominent controversy for St Johns Wood surrounds the question of whether Princes Albert and George visited St Johns Wood on their visit to Brisbane in 1881.

== Indigenous history ==
The St Johns Wood and wider area (Ashgrove's native name is "Kallindarbin") was originally inhabited by the indigenous Turrbal or "Duke of York" clan. The main thoroughfare, Waterworks Road, was built on a Turrbal pathway that led to Mount Coot-tha, a place of the "Honey-Bee Dreaming". The water holes along Enoggera Creek and its tributaries, with their dense fringing scrubs, met many of the needs of a hunter-gatherer society. With its rainforests, eucalypt forests and connection to the Brisbane River, it would have provided a source of freshwater and food for the Turrbal people. The rainforests yielded yams, black beans and wild figs, all of which still grow along the creek today. Everyday life for the tribe consisted of hunting and gathering food, with time for games, and other social and spiritual activities. Inevitably with the expansion of European influence the balance of land use changed and this led to the eventual displacement of the Turrbal from their traditional base.

== Original development ==
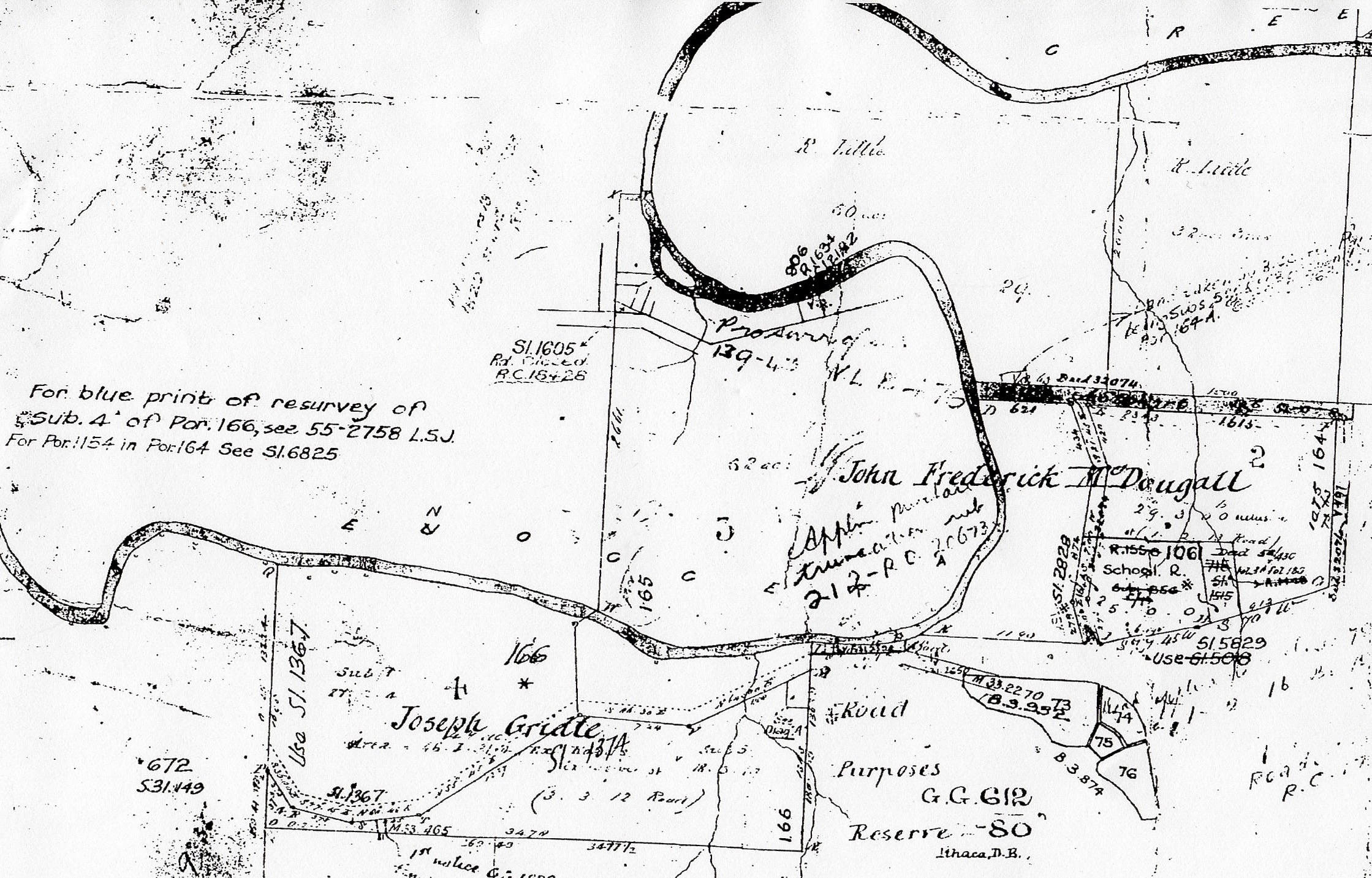
Original map of St Johns Wood 1858

The first Europeans were presented with well watered alluvial flats along Enoggera Creek, partly covered with scrub and presumably seen to include land suitable for cultivation. The land beyond the creek flats and in the foothills of the Taylor Range had better soil derived from the granite and was suitable for grazing. These were the factors that set the pattern for the sale of firstly leasehold and then freehold land by the crown in the pre-separation period.

The earliest known formal occupancy and use of the area by Europeans dates from 1849 when the first crown leases along Enoggera Creek were offered at public auction. The annual rent was 10 shillings per square mile. The area grossing 7020 acres which contained St Johns Wood was taken up by Darby McGrath in 1851 and was known as 'The Gap Station' on which he ran sheep. It is presumed that the lease of 'The Gap Station' was later extinguished by the crown as the granting of freehold land tenure spread along Enoggera Creek from 1856.

== St Johns Wood estate ==
The original St Johns Wood estate comprised an area 67 acres (27 ha) of the portions 165 and 381, Parish of Enoggera, part of which was originally purchased by John Frederick McDougall for a price of £70 4s 0d on 14 September 1858. This estate had been established as a cattle station by the Hon Mr. McDougall who employed fencer Simon Kelly to fence its perimeter. This work was completed by the middle of 1859. He sold portions 164 and 165 to Arthur Martin, auctioneer, during the economic crash of the mid-1860s. On 5 August 1864 Daniel Rowntree Somerset, Registrar of Pensions, purchased the land with final registrations of the titles on 10 July 1865 and later on 29 August 1867 purchased portion 381 making up the total of the estate. Somerset began to build "a magnificent home on his landed estate" in a U-shape plan, utilising the granite from the local hillside for the external walls and a shingle roof . and it is he who named the Estate St John's Wood after his Son Henry St John Somerset. He resided there for 4 years till after the death of his wife in February 1867 where the Funeral Notice states that they are to move from his residence St John's Wood, Water Works Road and the marriage of his eldest daughter Anna Sophia held at the Estate in May 1868.

=== The Harding Settlement ===
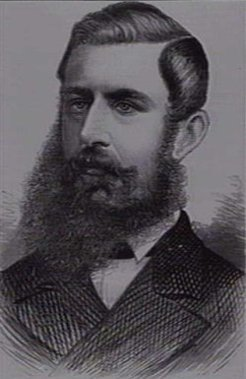
George Rogers Harding

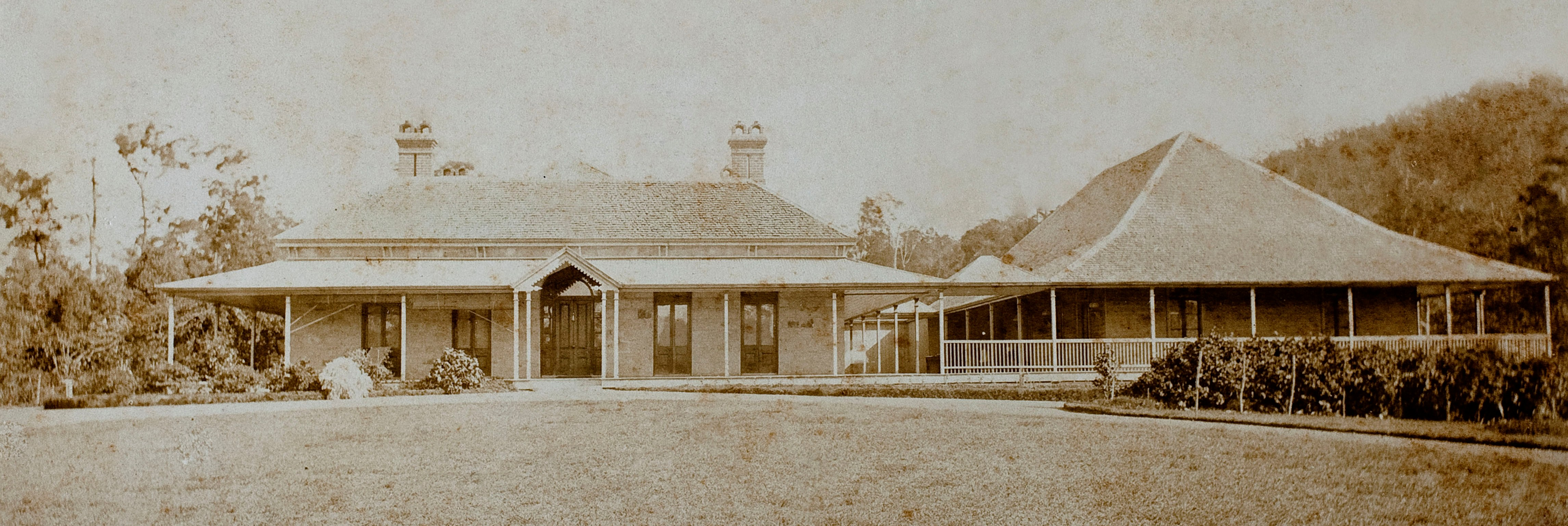
Cedar House, right

Somerset leased, in May 1868, Portions 164, 165 and 381 to the next occupier being George Rogers Harding, initially a young barrister who became a prominent Judge. Harding proceeded to purchase the property on 27 January 1874. He extended the Homestead, which became known as "The Granite House," by adding a ballroom by infilling the space between the two wings, constructed a separate adjacent building consisting mostly of bedrooms for his growing family which became known as the "Cedar House" due to the type of timber used in the construction, extended the Service Wing by two bedrooms for maids and men and added stables and yards. (Note: Clipping from Ashgrove Library.) He established an Orange Orchard on land across the Creek and purchased adjacent properties to increase his landholdings. The original property comprised a drawing room, dining room, large hall, smaller hall, library, "best" bedroom, dressing room, bachelor's room, seven other bedrooms, pantry, lumber room, two servants' rooms, kitchen, laundry and stables. Some of these rooms would have been in the adjacent building.

=== Entertainment at St Johns Wood House ===
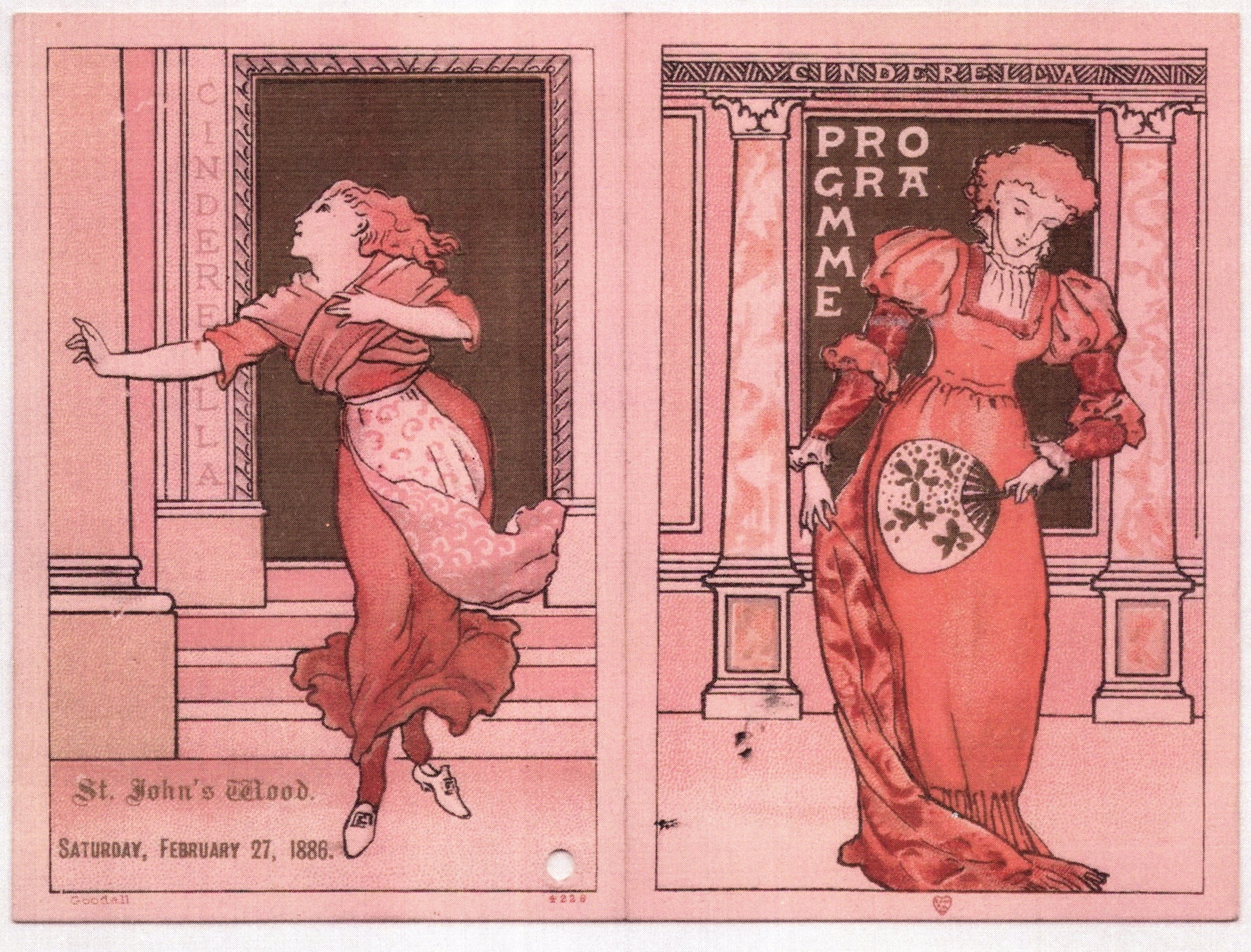
St. John's Wood dance card, 1886

The Harding family entertained extensively in their home and were well known for the banquets and entertainment that they provided. At a function on 23 June 1881, they were entertained by an Austrian band with dancing and in August 1881, the Hardings held a masquerade dance in their Ball Room. There is a copy of a banquet menu from 26 November 1884, where the guests had six courses, liqueurs, claret, and coffee. At "a large and brilliant gathering" in 1892, "guests including...Queensland Judges, the Chief Secretary and other Ministers, many members of both Houses and Legislature, of the legal profession, and of the civil service, and a large number of ladies. In all the number of visitors could not have been less than 500...the host and hostess charmingly received their visitors...A band of music was in attendance and the function passed off most pleasantly."

=== Royal visit controversy ===
Since the 1930s there have been reports that the Hardings entertained Prince Albert and Prince George on their visit to Brisbane in 1881. The young Princes (aged 17 and 16 respectively) are reported as having spent most of their leisure at St Johns Wood and Ashgrove, riding through the country and fishing on Enoggera dam with the Harding children. No other records could be found to verify this story, although it has become local folklore. They attended the Ministerial Picnic that was held at Enoggera Reservoir 19 August 1881, along with two hundred other guests, who enjoyed the boating and lunch in the large marquee. There is no evidence that on their return to Government House that they visited the Harding residence, although they passed through the property along Waterworks Road. Even without Royal patronage George Harding's professional status in the community would have made the many functions at his home well attended by Brisbane society.

=== St Johns Wood housing estate ===
After George Rogers Harding died in 1895 his estate was indebted to the Queensland National Bank Limited. The bank initially had difficulty in selling the land but eventually sold it in 1917 to the next owner, Francis Michael Anglim. Anglim initially used the land to breed thoroughbred brood mares. He subsequently subdivided the land in 1923, and sold it as a housing estate called St John's Wood after the house. In the following year the neighbouring Glen Lyon Estate was also subdivided, and the tramline to Ashgrove (Oleander Drive) was finally completed. This assisted in the rapid development of the area. In August 1927 a feature article appeared in the Brisbane Courier.

St Johns Wood ...on account of its beauty, has been sold to the best people in the State—people of wealth, repute and undoubted position. This alone will make the name of St Johns Wood a hallmark of distinction and exclusiveness.

A map advertised the sale of 800 allotments at Royal Park Estate, now The Gap and St. John's Wood Extension Estate, Ashgrove by F. M. Anglim in August 1927.

Anglim died in 1931. In 1934 Edward Albert Hawkins purchased the property and although he planned a major extension to the Granite House, it did not proceed and he remained living at his Clayfield residence. He converted the house into two flats, partly enclosing the verandas and separating the service wing at the rear into a separate dwelling. At the same time he obtained an old school building at auction from the West End State School and used the materials to reconstruct a Recreation Hall adjacent to the Granite House in 1936. His nephew, Mervyn E Hawkins, inherited the property on Mr Hawkins' death in 1956 and in 1958 he arranged a further subdivision of the remaining property into six building allotments, further reducing the size of the Granite House allotment to its present area of 1432m^{2}. This resulted in the front of the house facing the side boundary with access now from Piddington Street. Ownership of Granite House changed several times and Mr and Mrs Guerassimoff converted it back to a grand house and sold it in 1987.

== Embassy / Ambassador Hall ==
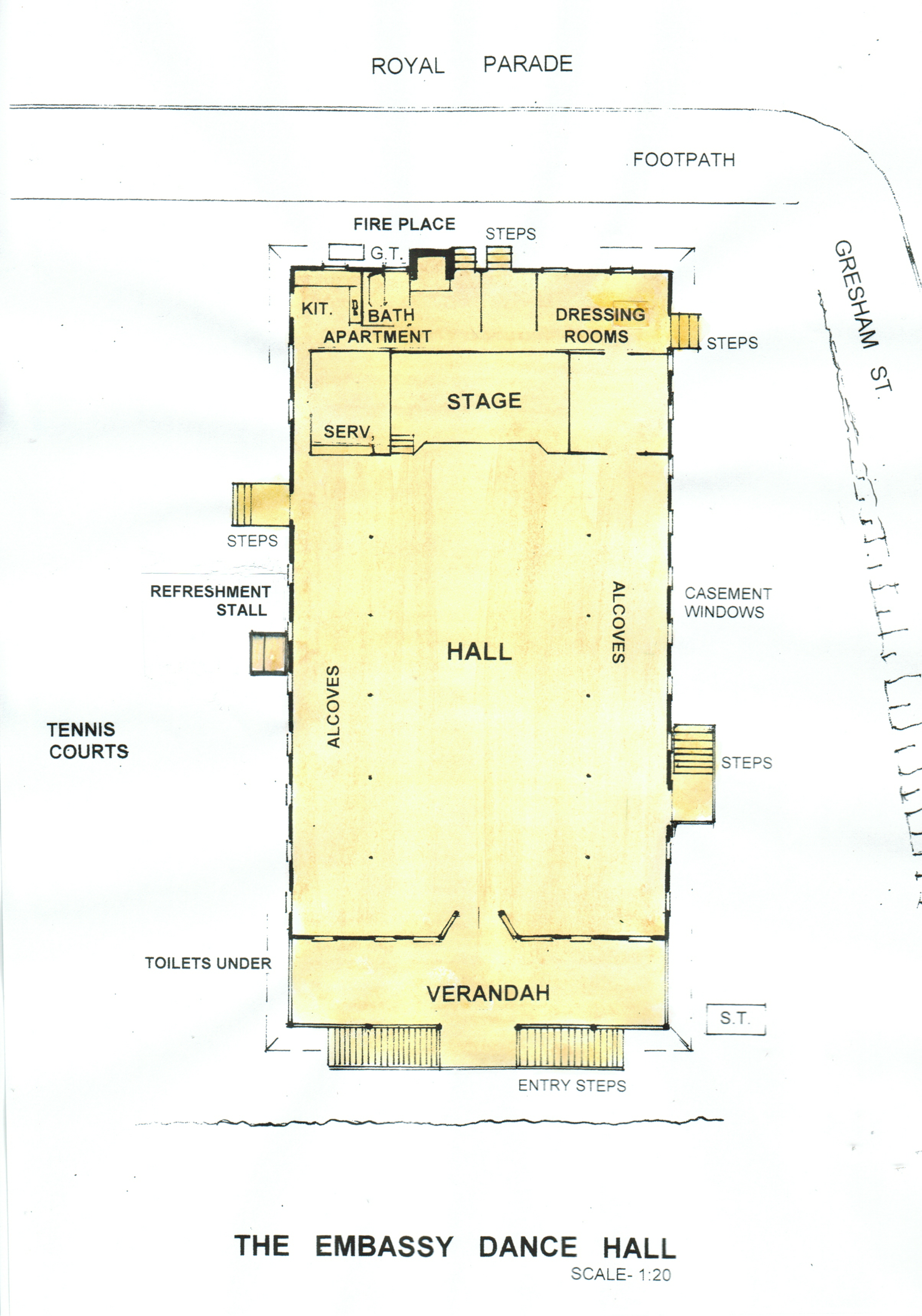
Embassy Dance Hall Floor Plan

The Embassy Dance Hall, and then the Ambassador Theatre, occupied the same building at different periods. It was located on the west corner of Gresham Street and Royal Parade, St John's Wood. Construction occurred in 1928 and was built for Frank Fraser Ltd. It was an all timber structure of 33.5m x 17m with a 6.5m ceiling height. Entry was from the Enoggera Creek end via a twin flight of stairs to a wide verandah. The Hall had side alcoves, a raised stage, two change rooms, a small apartment and a side refreshment counter. Male and female toilets were under the building at the creek end.

Initially it began as a cabaret style dance on Friday nights with simple dance evenings and private functions at other times. Many of the patrons came by electric tram to the terminus at Oleander Drive and then by special bus to the hall; others walked or came by motor car. Associated with the Hall were four tennis courts on the west side with high wire netting fences. These were flood-lit for night use.

During World War II, the 2/1st Australian Chemical Warfare Laboratory of the Australian Army took over the hall and adjacent tennis courts between 1943 and 1945. This was a secretive unit where all sorts of chemical gases and munitions were tested.

In 1947, Bert Hyde became the owner of the building and lived in the enclosed verandah. He converted the hall into a picture theatre which he called the Ambassador Theatre. He built a projection room through the roof, put a screen on the stage and installed canvas seats. Screenings occurred on Saturday nights. The small structure on the west side was converted into a grocery shop which served the patrons on picture nights as well as the residents of St Johns Wood.

With the advent of television in 1959, its popularity waned and on 17 December 1960 the last regular screening occurred. The Hall was still used for other functions such as square dances and pop bands. Bert Hyde died in 1970 and the building was sold.

The 1974 flood did not affect the building structurally but it was becoming somewhat derelict and the Brisbane City Council issued a notice to the new owners to demolish the building, thus ending the life of the building which had served the community for 46 years.

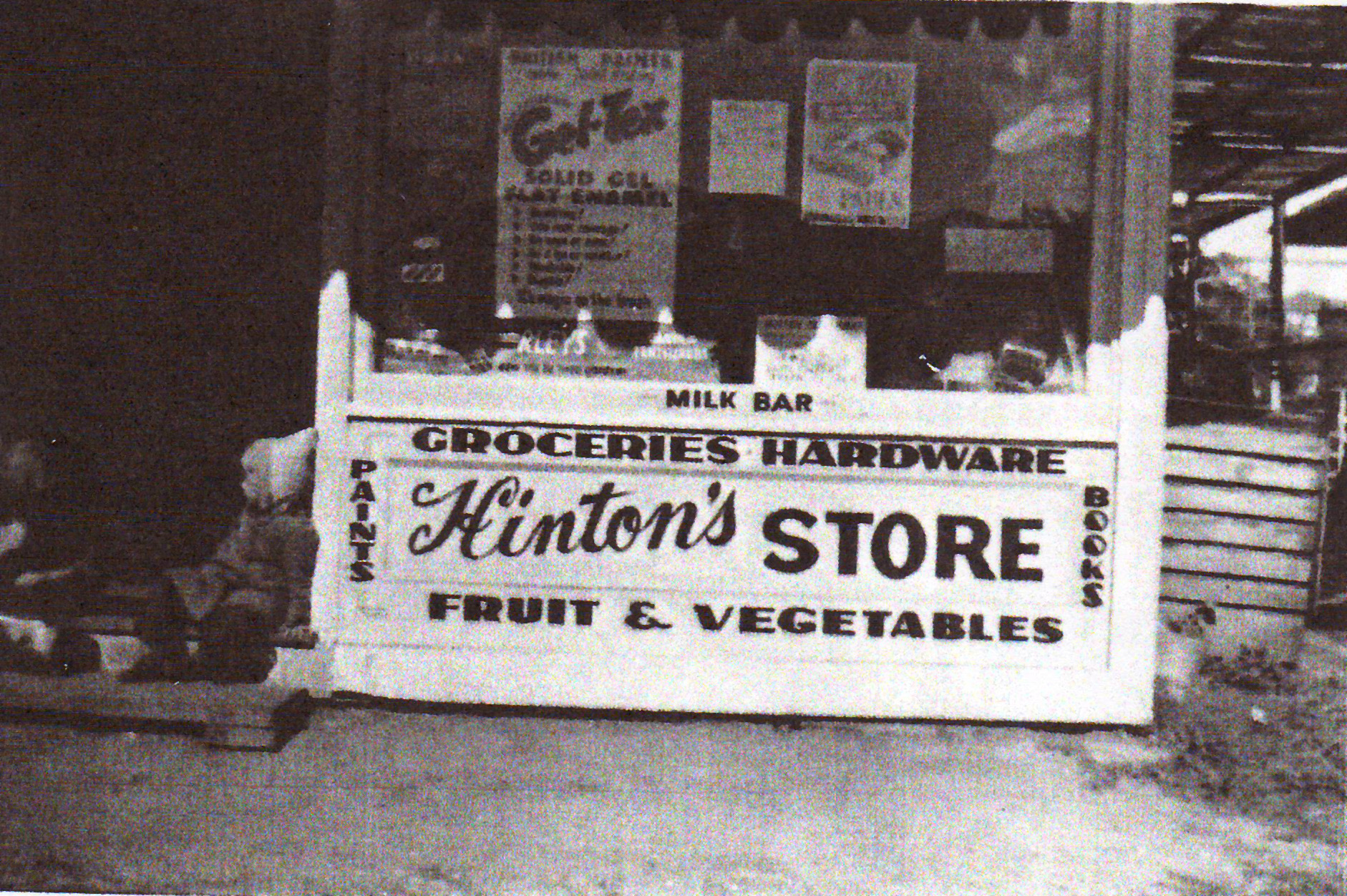
Grocery Store exterior

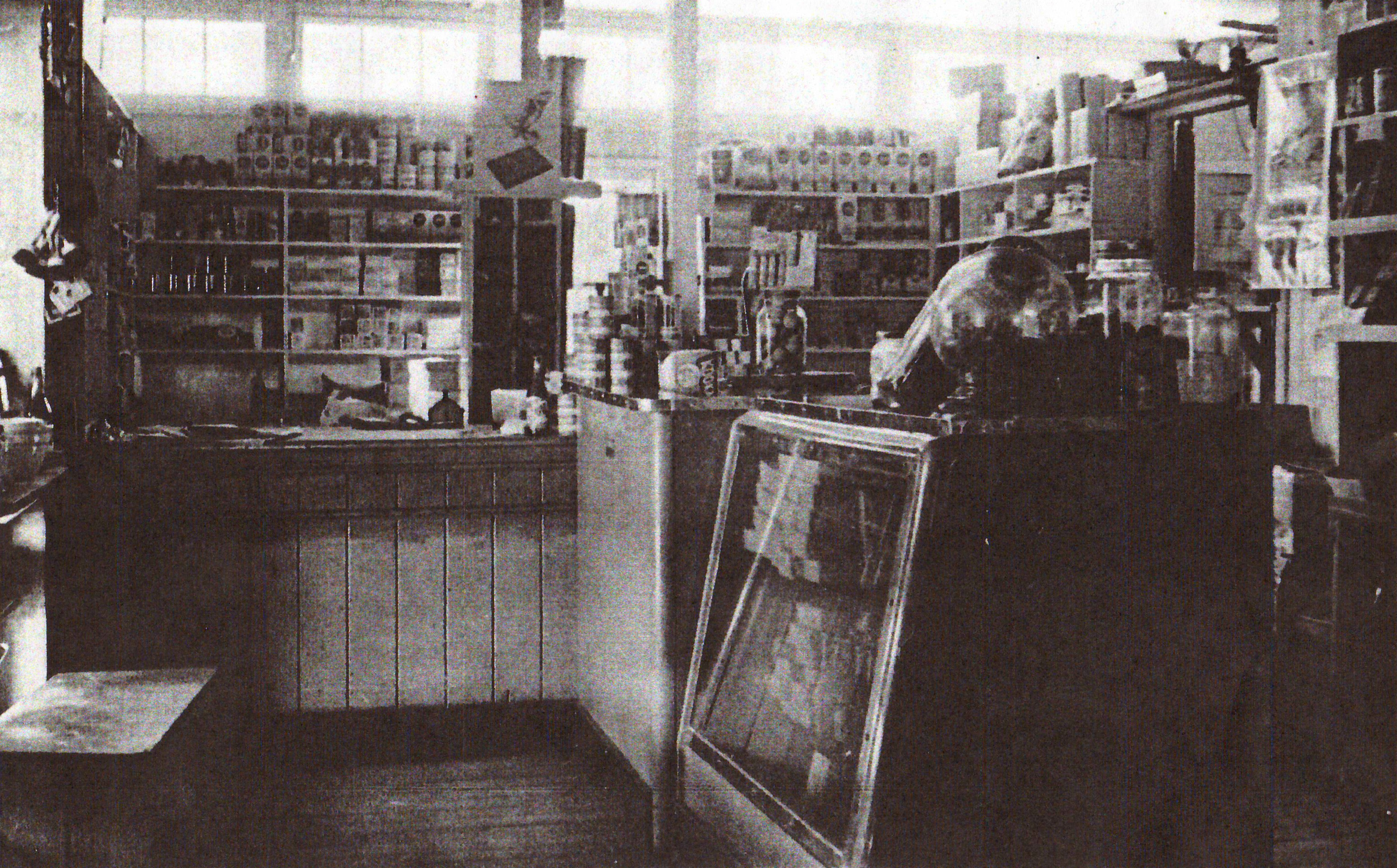
Grocery Store interior

== The weir ==
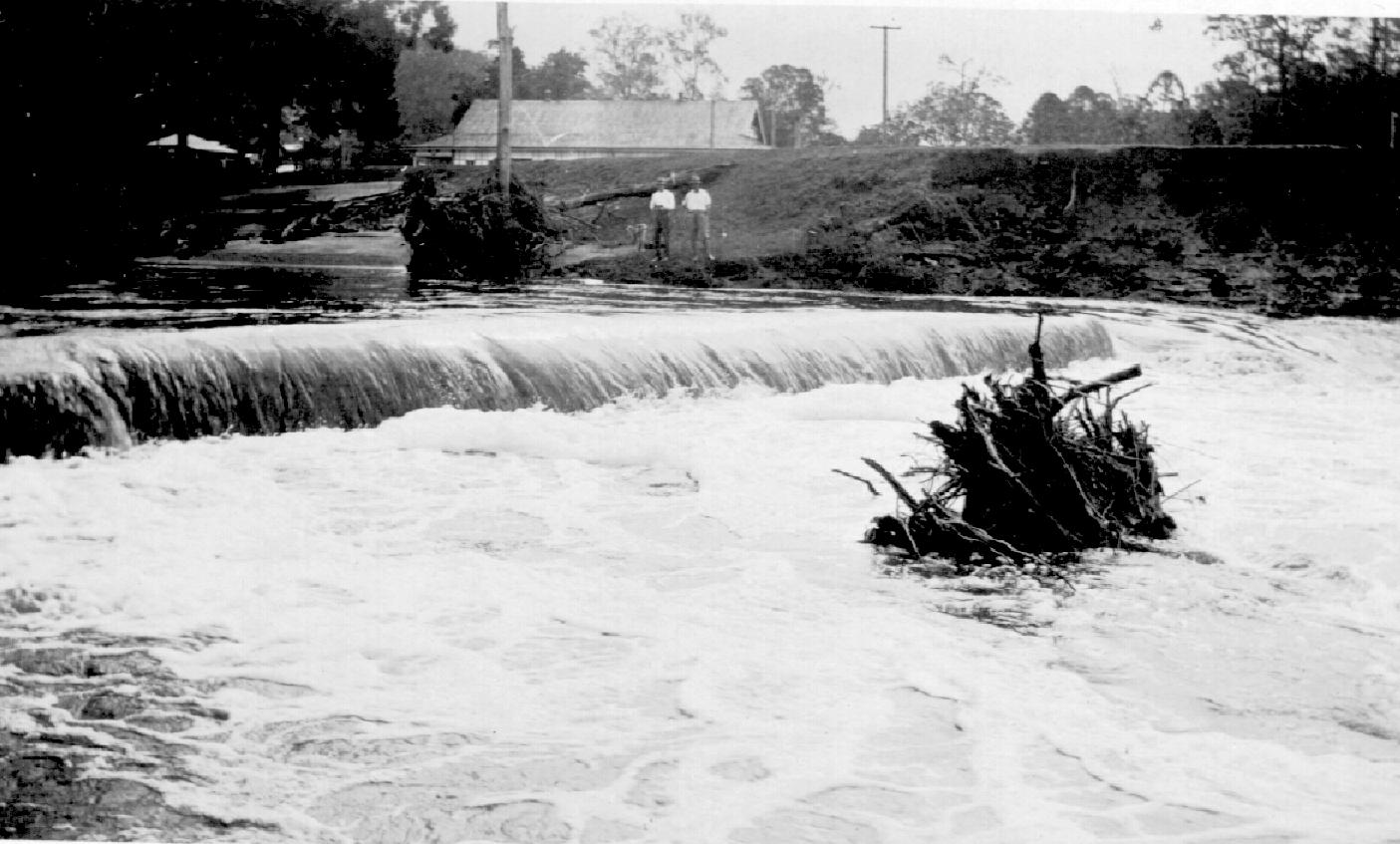
The original weir in flood.

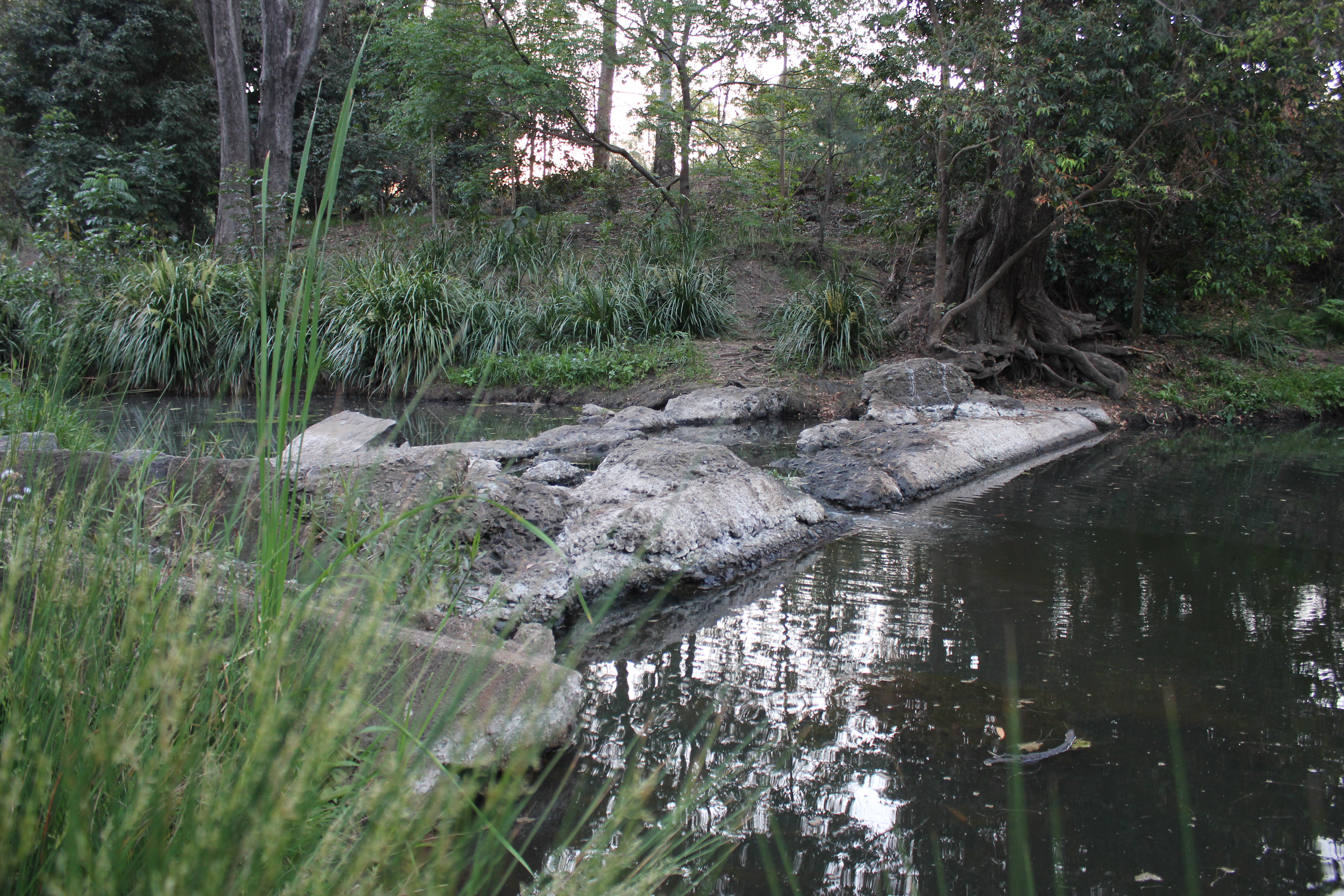
Remnants of the weir, present day.

As part of Mr Anglim's vision for the housing estate, he had the idea to create a recreation area along the banks of the Enoggera Creek and a lake formed by the construction of a small weir across the creek. In August 1928 one of Mr Anglim's compatriots, Mr Fraser, applied to the Brisbane City Council for approval to build a weir a few chains on the city side of the new bridge entering St Johns Wood and he was to bear the cost of its construction.

In January 1929 tenders were called for the construction of the weir. Applicants were to apply via Telephone No C 8506 to obtain Tender Documents. Note: The telephone number is that which belongs to Mr Anglim at his Town Hall office address (a central town contact is better than out in the country, even though Mr Fraser was the organiser.)

The construction of the weir, according to the council minutes, was designed by the council's Civil Engineers Department which was a concrete and reinforced steel structure. The creation of this lake proved very popular with the community as many social functions were held as recorded in the newspapers. Those activities were swimming, canoeing, various games of sport and picnics. As part of this two small bathing boxes were erected as change rooms on the flat area close to the edge of the top of the bank. In 1931 a devastating flood in Enoggera Creek occurred under-mining the supporting earth bank at the west end of the concrete weir wall, reducing the water-retaining capacity of the wall and was not able to serve its design purpose – as well the bathing boxes were washed away and were not replaced. History has not recorded the outcome of the weir but it is believed within the community that the structure was dynamited and destroyed some time in the 1940s. The concrete across the floor of the creek which can be seen near the St Johns Wood Scout's Hall is all that remains of the original weir.

== A house crosses Enoggera Creek to become a hospital ==
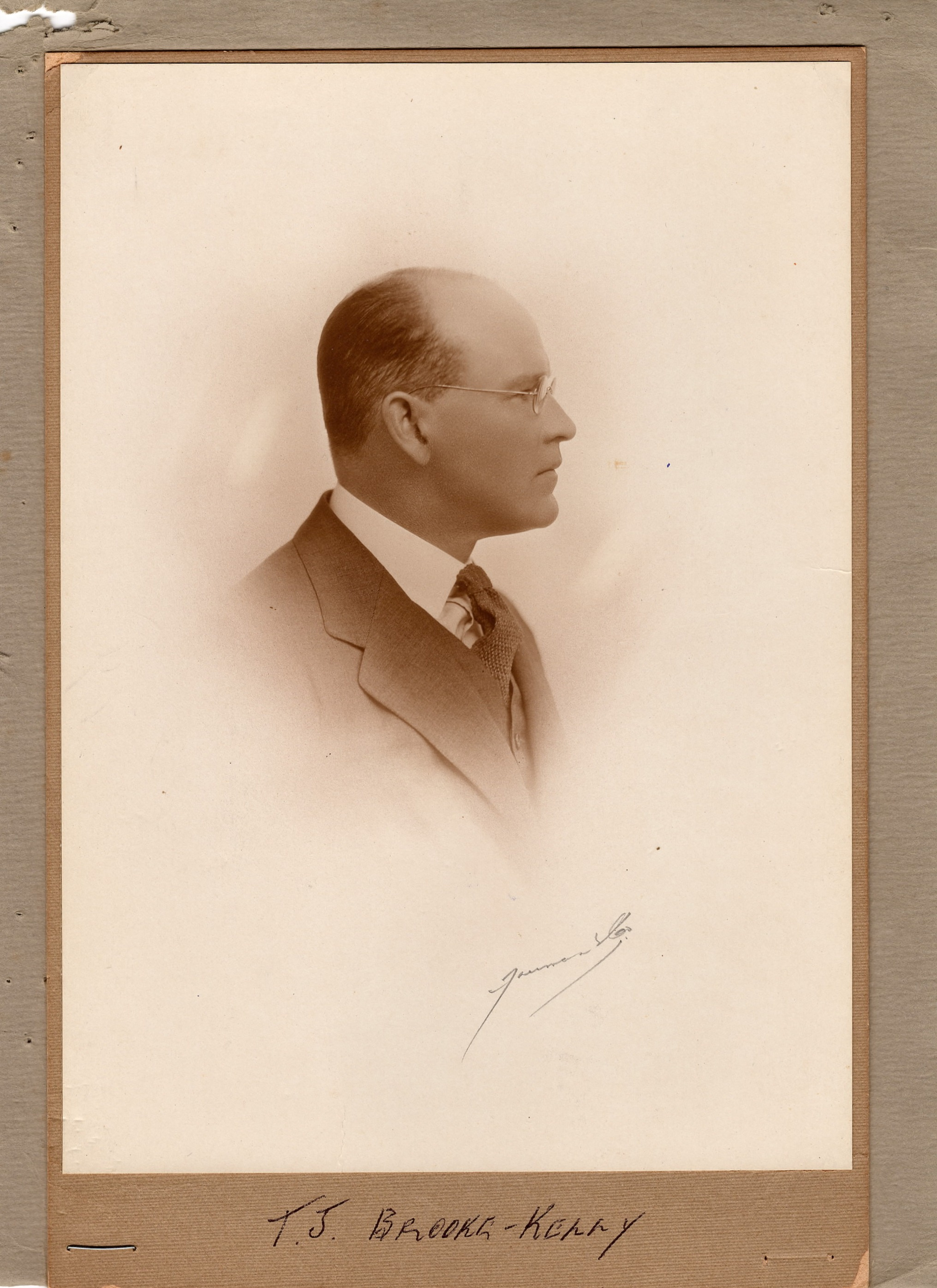
Dr Brooke-Kelly

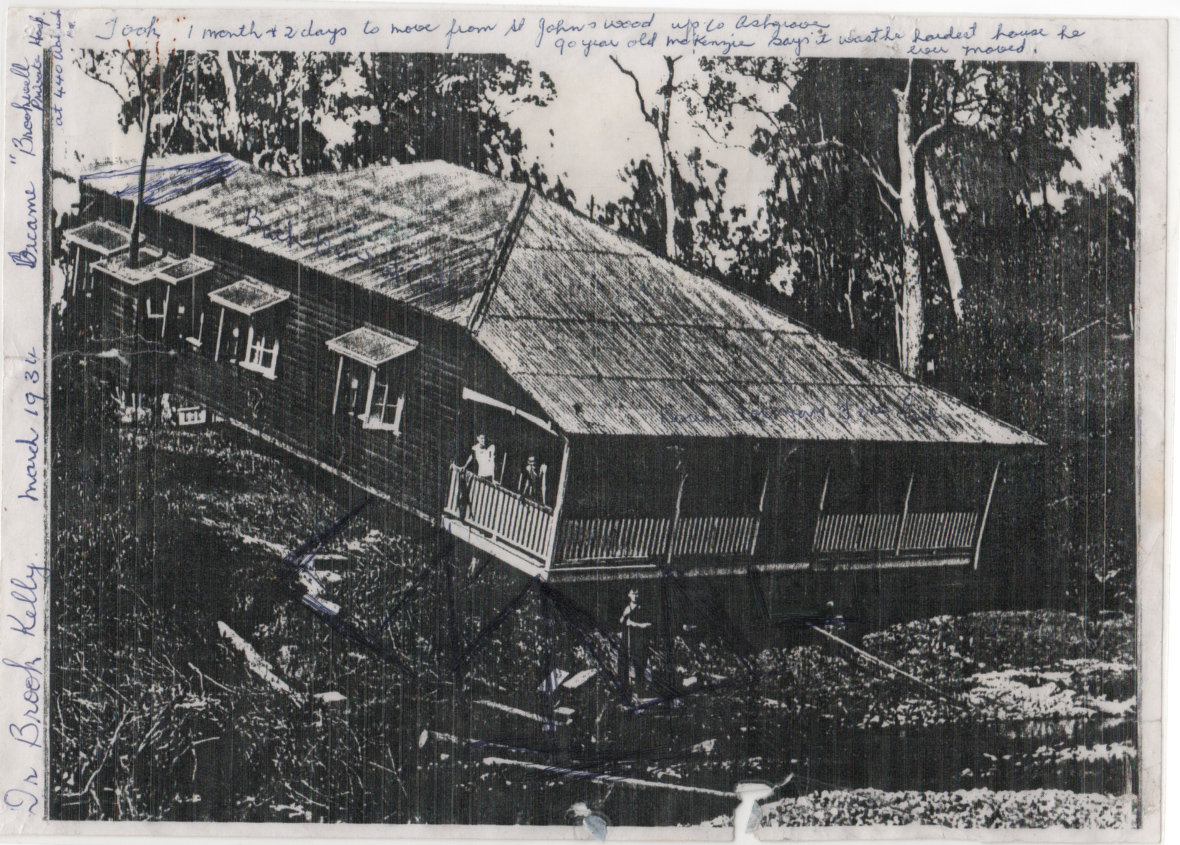
A House Crosses the Creek

Dr Thomas Brooke-Kelly was one of the earliest residents of St Johns Wood from 1931 to 1934. He and his wife Lavinia and only son Noel lived down the bottom of St Johns Avenue, not far from the current pedestrian "banana" bridge. Dr Brooke-Kelly, a surgeon, had an ambition to have his own hospital. With the extension of the tram line from Oleander Drive to what was called The Terminus, near Ashgrove State School, he decided to shift his home in St Johns Wood to a block of land at 438 Waterworks Road, Ashgrove, and convert it into a hospital. He would add two bedrooms underneath.

He employed the McKenzie Brothers, from Station Terrace Dutton Park, for a price of 600 pounds. The removal, in March 1934, became part of the folklore in the McKenzie family business. It was recalled as the most difficult job they ever did – down and across the Enoggera Creek bed, roads terrible, hill steep, and house too large. It took one month and two days to move it. "It was fascinating to watch...they lowered the house, in one piece, on to large timber slides, dragged the house to the creek bank and then slid and pulled it across the creek on substantial hardwood bearers. It was hard tough work and required a lot of muscle. Once across the creek the contractor raised the house on to a large wooden wheeled jinker."

It became Brookwell Private Hospital at 438 Waterworks Road until 1937. Dr Brooke-Kelly moved many times in his career as a doctor and died, aged 93 in Clayfield. He is buried at Toowong Cemetery (with the Robinson family).

== The dairy farm ==
In the early 1930s St Johns Wood operated a dairy to produce milk for the residents. It was within the residential allotments which were bounded along the street alignments of Buckingham Street (from No 45), Grand Parade, St John's Avenue and across the block at the gully (to No.45). This covered approx 2 ha (5 acres) and had a barbed wire fence enclosing the area.

This was operated by the Peake family. They lived in their house at No 57 Buckingham Street and the cow sheds were 50 m (164 ft) up hill. They had a herd of approximately 25 cows which were producing 455 L (100 imp gal) of milk per day.

As this was a somewhat small land area to accommodate the herd of cows and as there were lots of "feed" outside this, as well as there were only a small number of houses and much vacant land, at times the cows were let out, without a "herdsman" to wander along the creek banks and across the properties then returning to the home paddock prior to milking. This occurred until 1939 when it ceased operating. The original house still exists and the current owners affectionately call it "The Dairyman's Cottage". Roy Mac Arthur was a "billy boy" for Stephen Peake:

At most residences the lady of the house put a china jug, with a beaded cloth mesh cover, on the front steps to receive the milk. You were in big trouble if you spilt any milk on to the hardwood tread or flooring. A milk stain is difficult to remove.

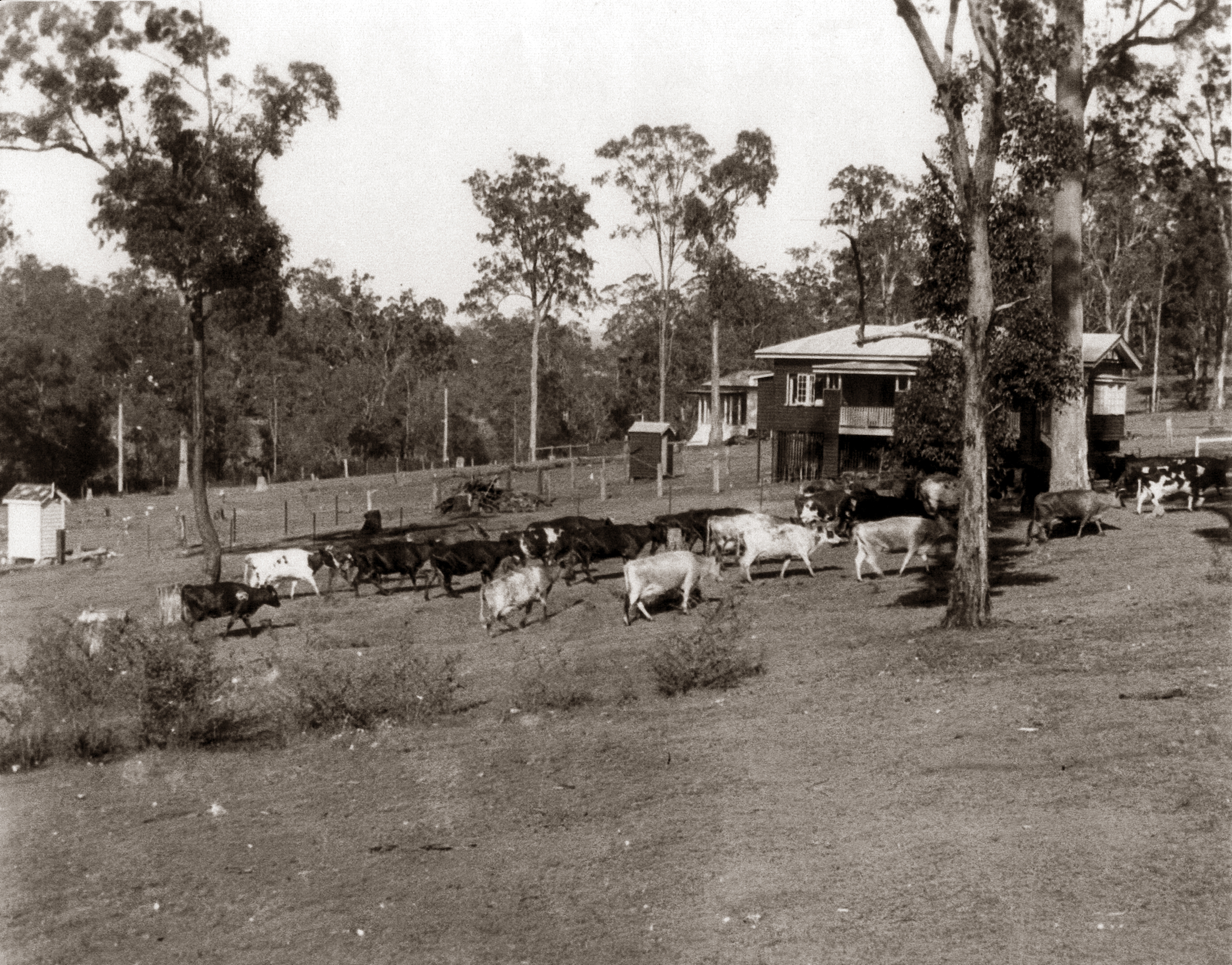
Dairy cows around 38 Piddington St, St Johns Wood. Ekka Wednesday 1938

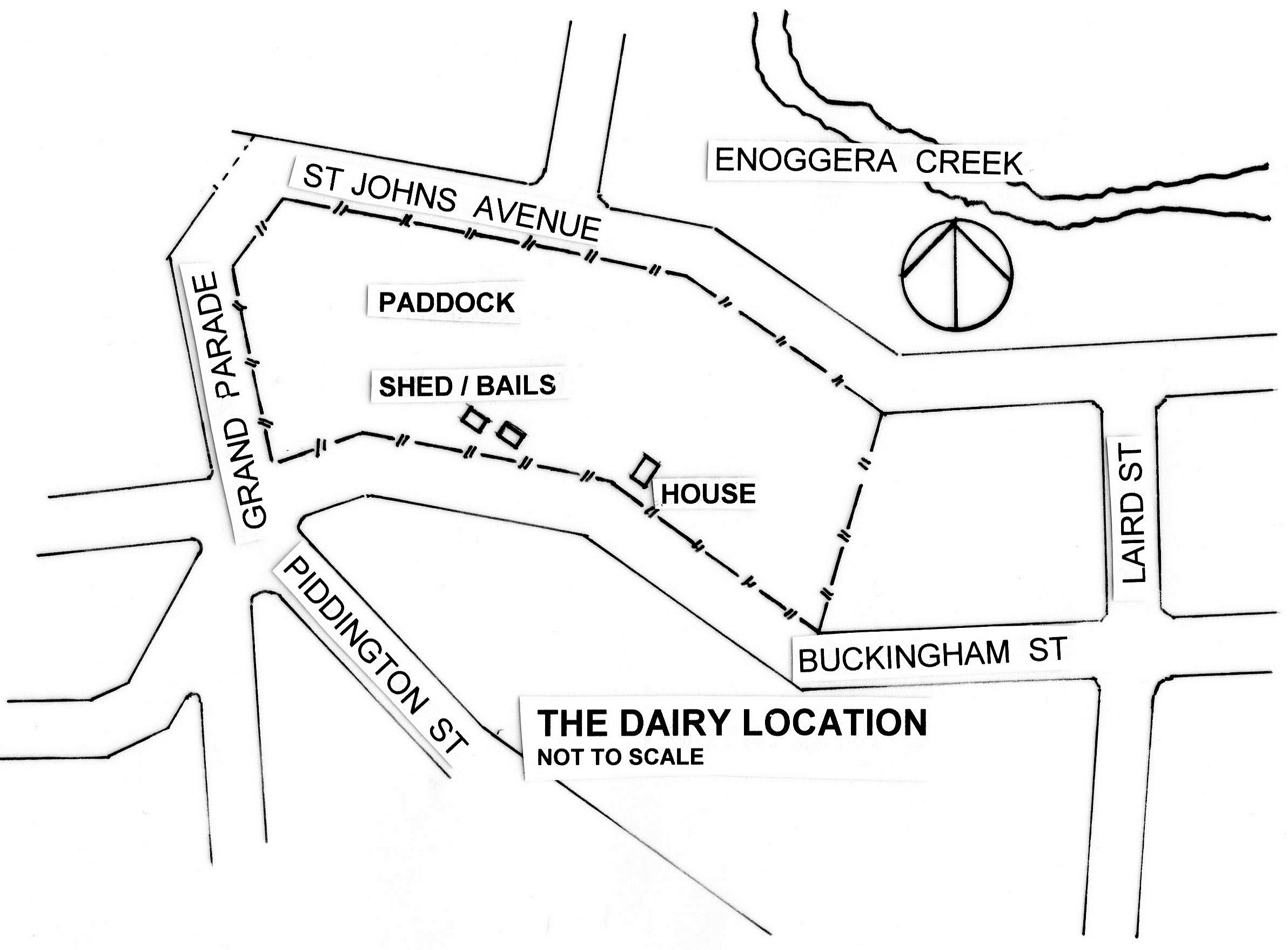
Map of Peake's Dairy Farm. Attribution: Morris Moorhouse

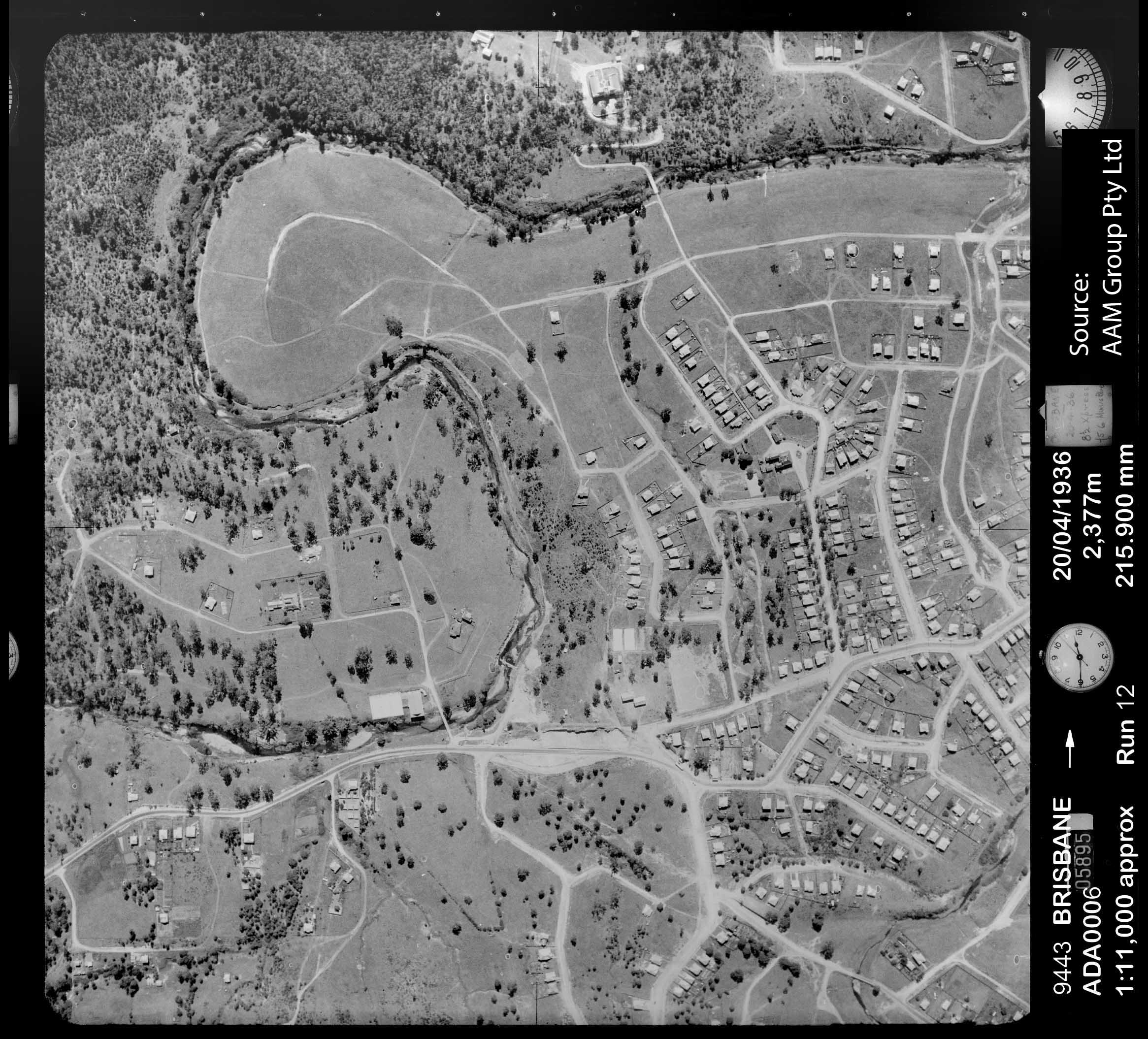
This is the earliest aerial photograph available of St. Johns Wood; taken in 1936.

== World War II ==
=== Air Raid Precautions Post – St Johns Wood Recreation Hall ===
Prior to May 1941, the Queensland Government had established only a small number of Air Raid Precaution (ARP) posts. These posts were scattered across Brisbane and were staffed by professional personnel drawn from the various emergency services. The ARP post established at the St Johns Wood Recreation Hall in Laird Street on 17 May 1941 was different. It was organised through the local community and it was staffed and largely equipped by civilian volunteers. To encourage the formation of more community-run ARP posts, a procession involving civil defence organisations from different Brisbane suburbs assembled at the Jubilee Tce police station and marched to the new ARP post for its official opening. The St John's Wood ARP post was a new concept as community-based volunteers who provided both their expertise and some of the equipment required to run it. Mr. W.R. Johnstone, a resident of Piddington Street, established this new ARP post. He paid to equip the first-aid centre and Mr. E.A. Hawkins of Clayfield arranged premises in a room of the St Johns Wood Hall. Local registered nurse G. Weight offered to staff the centre, while her husband R.J. Weight offered his car as a temporary ambulance. Other local residents also volunteered their own cars and trucks and Mr. C.W. Bellingham lectured on first-aid.

=== 2/1 Australian Chemical Warfare Laboratory St John's Wood Hall ===
The use of chemical weapons by the Japanese in China increased the threat of chemical warfare during World War II. The allied forces in Australia stockpiled chemical weapons to be used in retaliation, and carried out experiments on the effectiveness of various gases and compounds. The Australian Government also established significant chemical weapon stocks and established a number of testing facilities and depots across the country.

This military organisation was originally formed as part of the Royal Australian Engineers in mid-1942, under the leadership of infantry Captain Jim McAllester. Known initially as the 2/1st Australian Mobile Anti-gas Laboratory, it was located in Broadmeadows Camp in Victoria. Following a name change to 2/1st Australian Chemical Warfare Laboratory in February 1943 it was moved to Brisbane to be closer to field operations. Approval was given to re-establish the laboratory at the St Johns Wood hall in Royal Parade in August 1943, and it was in operation at that site by October.

The mobile chemical warfare laboratory operated by the unit had been constructed in recognition of its need to be mobile in Australia in event of enemy chemical attack, and potentially to be used in the Pacific area of operations. The tasks and processes adopted by the unit were similar to those of British units, and were well established by the time they settled in at St Johns Wood. The Laboratory was tasked with the examination of enemy chemical weapons, ammunition, and protective clothing and respirators.

At various times the St Johns Wood Laboratory also stored larger quantities of chemicals. In February 1944 for example, 75 boxes of 25-pounder shells containing bromobenzyl cyanide (known as BBC) were delivered for training purposes. The site is believed to have been cleared when abandoned by the Army.

=== The Woods Memorial Playground ===
A single Kauri pine (Agathis robusta) stands behind an upright Mt. Coot-tha bluestone boulder to commemorate Flight Sergeant Clifford Berger Hopgood. The memorial stands in a leafy children's playground on the banks of the Enoggera Creek, facing north, and the boulder is 1.6 m (5.2 ft) high. It bears a plaque with the inscription:

To the Memory of Flt/Sgt Clifford Berger Hopgood
Killed in action over Occupied Europe
24 February 1944
This Tree Was Planted By His Friends of St. Johns Wood

A local resident, Marjorie Summerville, recalls being present at the planting of the memorial tree to Clifford Hopgood and the placement of the seat with the plaque, sometime after World War II. According to the council park history for the site, the seat was destroyed (possibly by the 1974 flood) and the plaque re-erected on the large Mt. Coot-tha bluestone boulder, one week before Anzac Day, 1974. (Note: Brisbane City Council Park History Files.)

Former St Johns Wood Councillor for The Gap ward, Brian Hallinan, believes the planting occurred sometime in the early 1950s. The friends referred to on the plaque were an informal group of St Johns Wood residents.

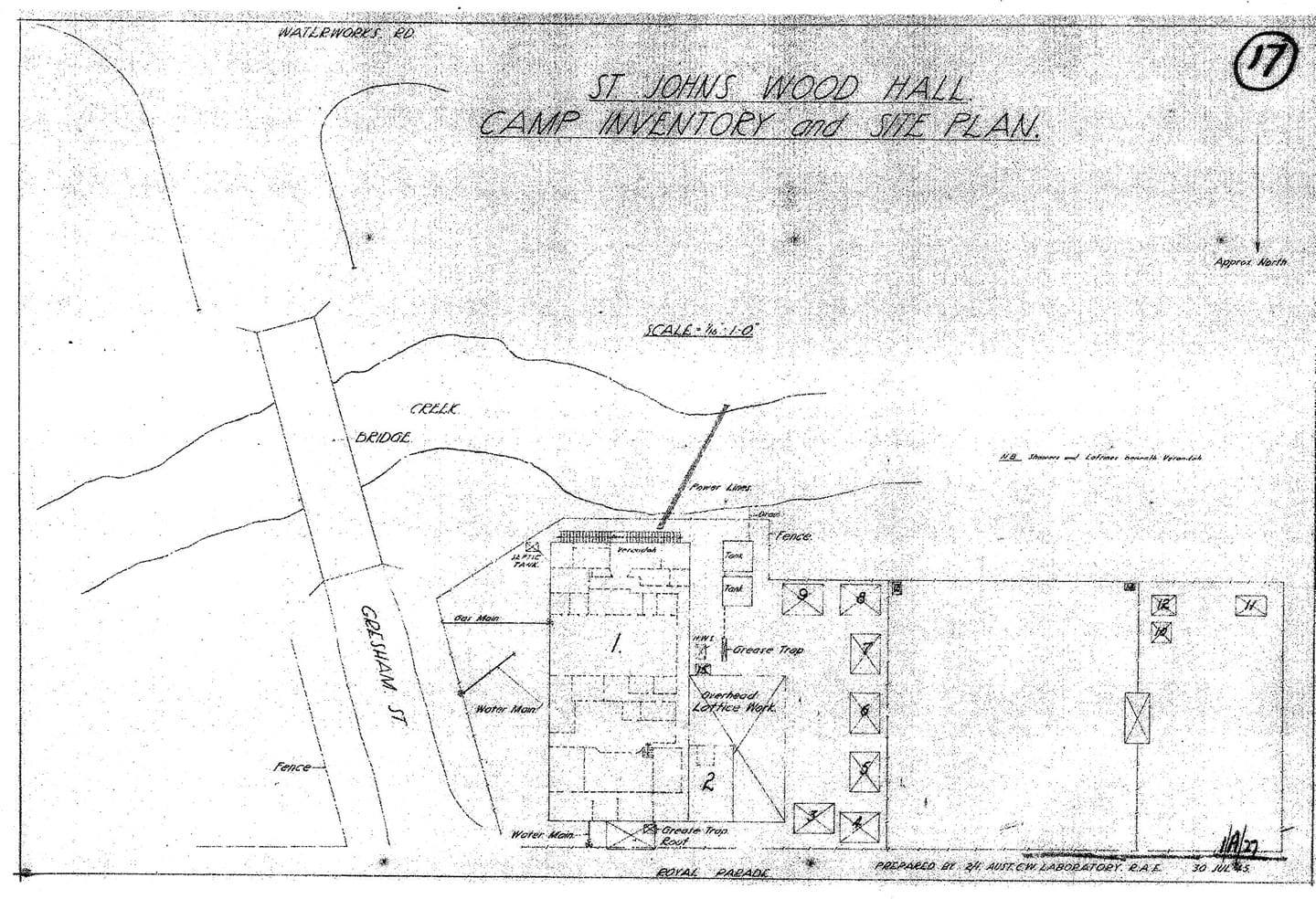
Plan of the Australian Army Chemical Warfare laboratory

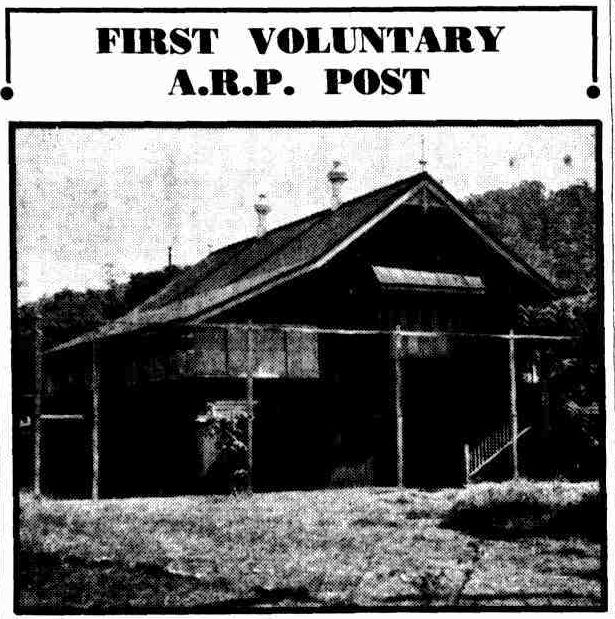
St John's Wood recreation hall Air Raid Precaution (ARP) post

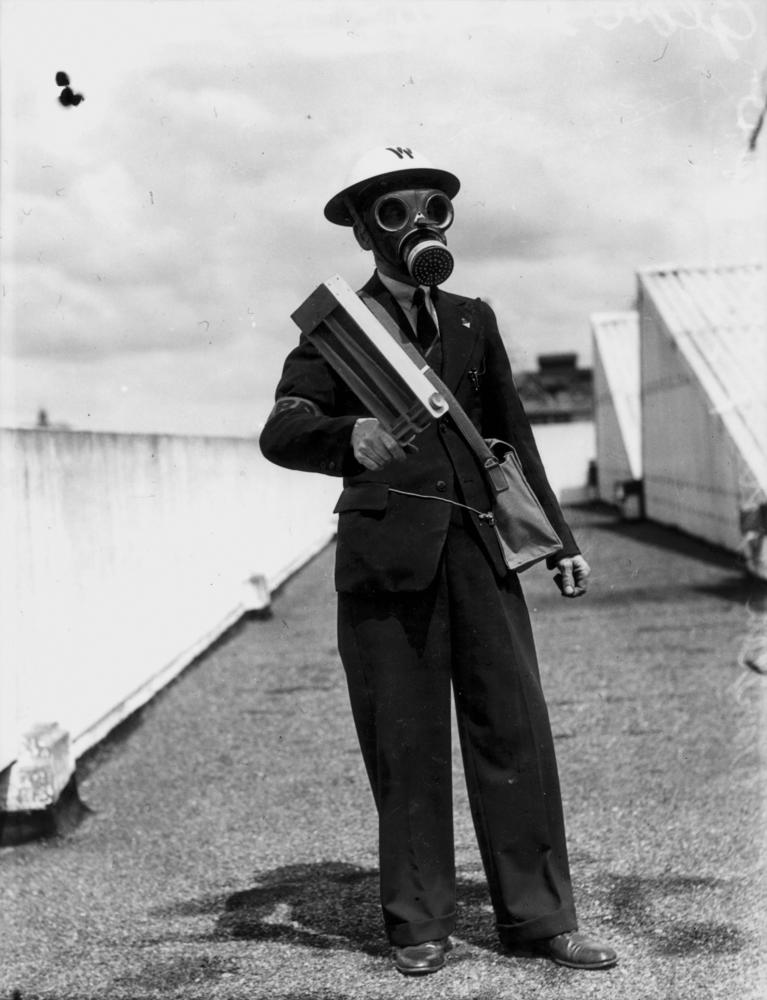
Air Raid Warden testing new equipment in Brisbane, October 1942

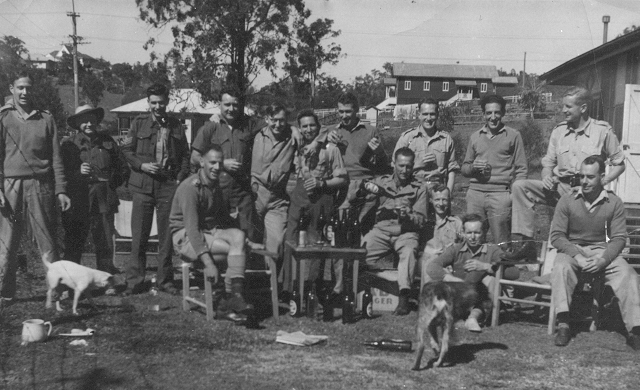
Australian Servicemen outside the Embassy Dance Hall, St Johns Wood, Ashgrove, Brisbane. Mater Dei Church in Background circa 1943

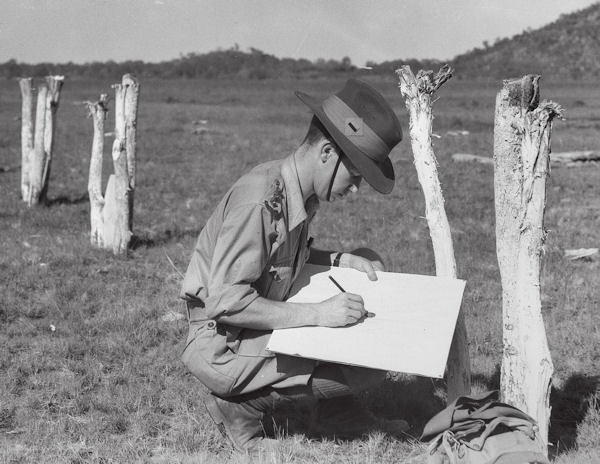
Captain (later Major) Jim McAllester, 2/1st Australian Chemical Warfare Laboratory

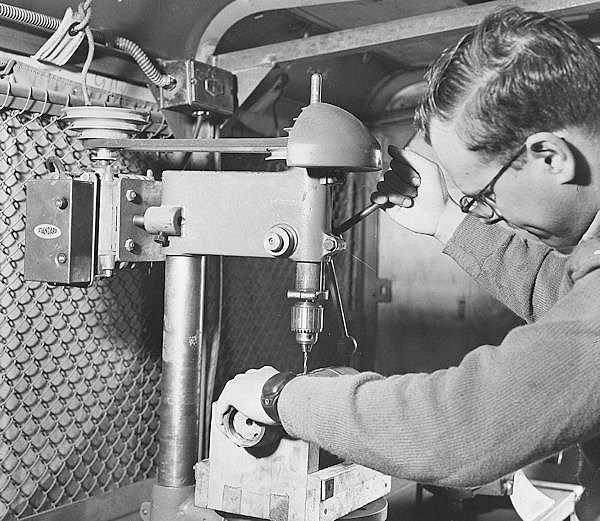
No. 2. Chemical Warfare Laboratory: Testing used gas mask

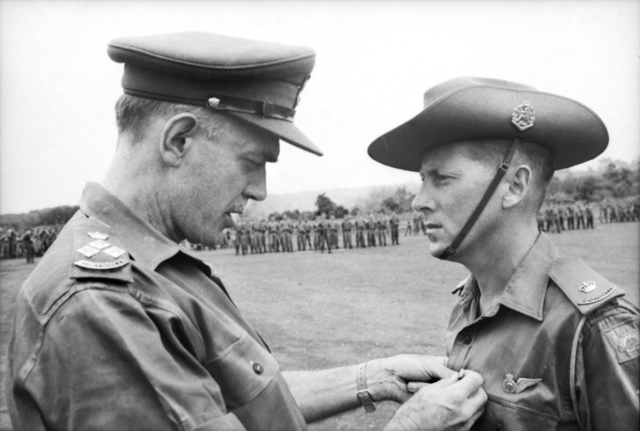
Major Harry Smith of St. John's Wood, Brisbane, Qld, receiving the ribbon to the Military Cross for gallantry from Brigadier O. D. Jackson.

== St Johns Wood Scout Group ==
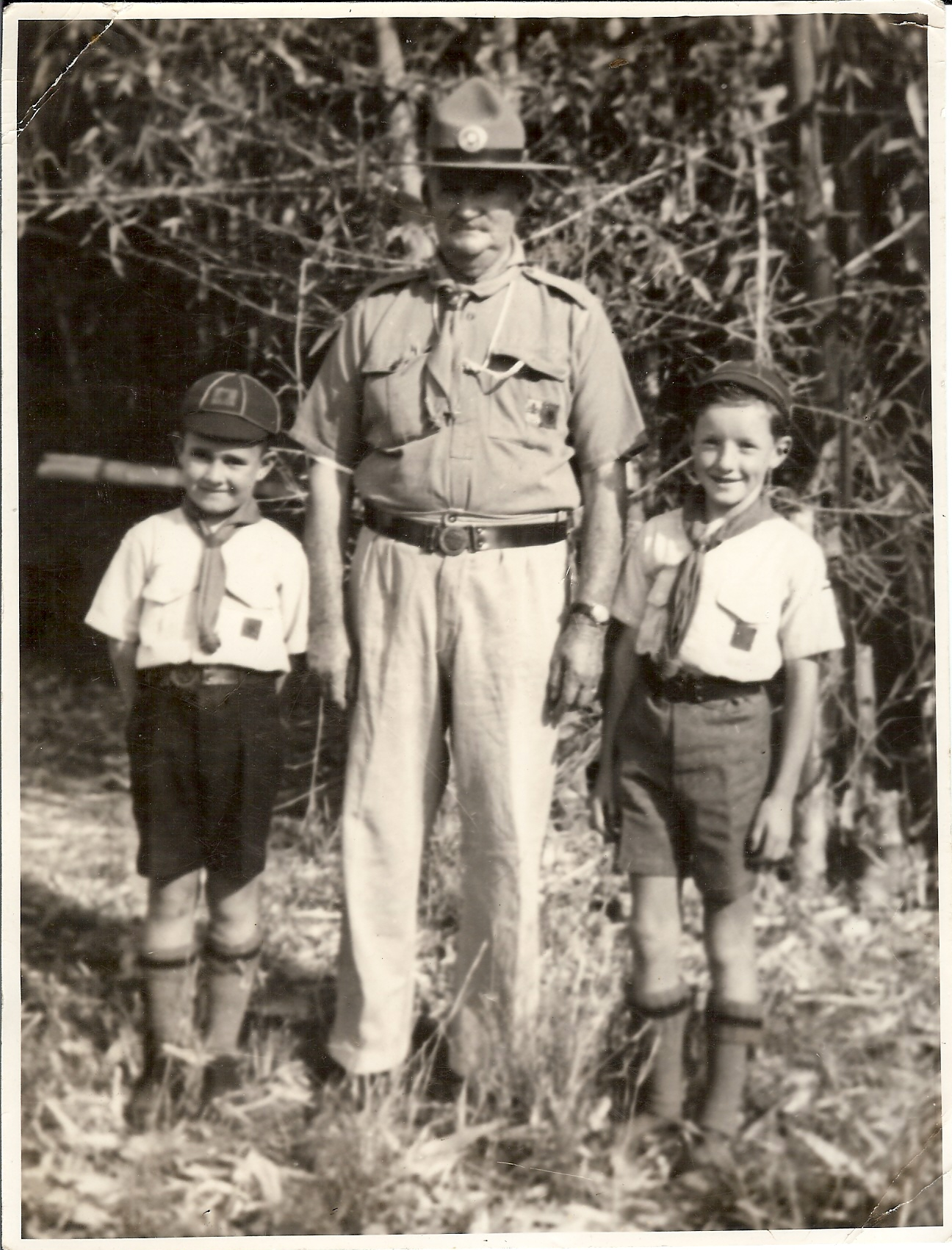
"Pop" W. R. Johnstone with two Cub scouts. Feb 1948

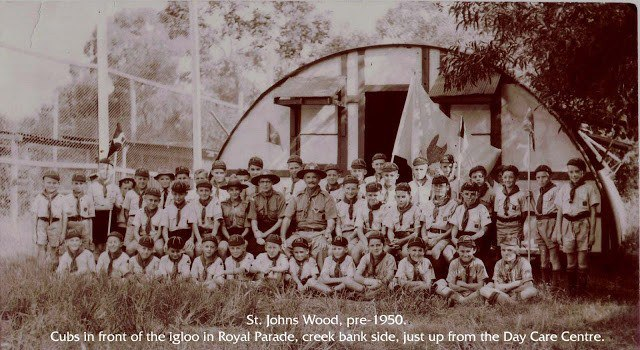
St. John's Wood Scouts, 1945. Cubs in front of US Army Quonset Hut.

There has been a "scout" presence in St Johns Wood since before World War II. During the war, the local Red Cross branch would hold their meetings in the "Scout's hall". However, the 1st St Johns Wood Scout Group did not begin officially until 9 March 1945. "Pop" Johnstone was the first Cub Master, and the Cub Pack met in the Igloo in Royal Parade, 100m or so west of the Gresham Street intersection. An article on "Australia's Tiniest Hospital", Target included a photo of "Pop" Johnstone with two Cubs. He remained Cub Master until 1946, when he became Group Scout Master. He led the Group until June 1947, when he resigned for health reasons.

The Scout section started in August 1945, with four boys from the Ashgrove Troop and six new recruits, meeting at the hall in Laird Street in the grounds of Granite House. William arranged for a lease of land in Royal Parade from the Brisbane City Council and purchased an Army Quonset hut from the United States Army for the St John's Wood Cubs after WWII. The first Scout Master was Jas "Skip" Garland, who came from Baralaba. The Senior Scout section of the Group started in 1954. In his annual report, the Chairman of the Group Committee reported that Cliff Farmer was appointed Senior Scout Master. The 'Seniors' met in the Army Quonset Hut on Friday nights while the Cubs met there on Saturdays. Senior Scouts are known now as Venturer Scouts. The Rover Scout section started in 1959. "Secondly, during March we began a Rover Crew, thus adding the fourth section to the Group." The first Rover Leader was Ian "Sailor" Webb who came to us through a fortuitous meeting with the then Group Scout Master "Kernel" Matthews.

By this time the Group had moved to the quarry site west of the Ashgrove State School. The Quonset Hut was later moved adjacent to the Boy Scouts in the old quarry but was lost in the 1974 flood. Cubs and Scouts met in the main Den; the Senior Den was built in 1959 and the Rovers built their own Den in 1963. The Joey Scout section started in 1991, and was an immediate success. The St Johns Wood Scout Fellowship, open to adult members, had their inaugural meeting on 10 February 1992.

The Group has been, and is, an integral part of the local community. It is responsible for helping shape the physical, intellectual, emotional, social and spiritual development of its members. The Group has been fortunate to have had, over the years, an energetic leadership team; men and women committed to the inculcation of social and moral values in the boys and girls in their charge. In addition to Group activities such as camps and rallies, fetes and fairs, Scouting affords participation in worldwide events such as Jamborees, Ventures and Moots, and St Johns Wood has a proud history of active involvement in these pursuits at all levels.

== Flooding ==
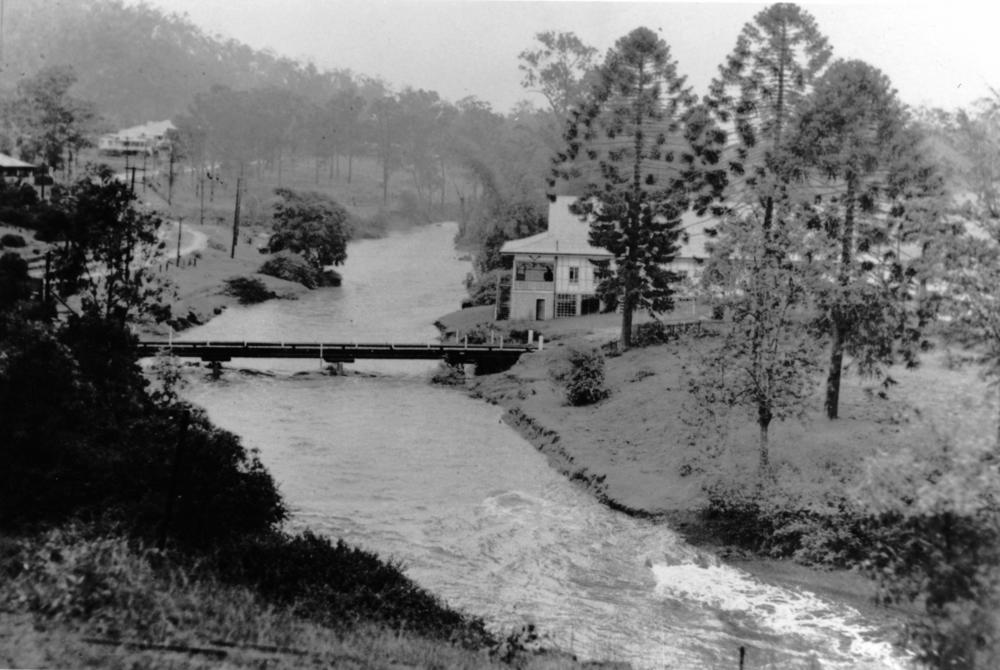
Floodwaters at Enoggera Creek, St John's Wood, Brisbane, 1938

Due to St Johns Woods geography (being bordered on three sides by Enoggera Creek), there is a high risk of flooding on the parkland surrounding the creeks. In February 1931 a flood destroyed the Gresham Street Bridge, after 457 mm (18 in) of rain fell at Enoggera in 48 hours. During the 1974 Brisbane flood, waters in Enoggera Creek rose by up to 6.5 m (21.3 ft) and many houses were washed away. Today, parks take their place and provide a buffer against repeated flooding. On 20 May 2009 all access to St Johns Wood was cut off due to localised flooding for most of the afternoon and night. In January 2013, ex tropical Cyclone Oswald caused flooding to Enoggera Creek, which inundated the Gresham Street bridge and destroyed the 'Banana' pedestrian bridge to the Ashgrove Sports ground.

== Rainbow Subdivision/St Johns Wood Hill ==
The locale of St Johns Wood comprises portions 165, 166, 381 and 382 in the Parish of Enoggera, Brisbane. The land on the western perimeter of St Johns Wood identified as Portion 382 being an area of 15 acres (6 ha), 1 rod and 16 perches was originally purchased 10 August 1864 by Joseph Berry. This land remained intact until subdivision in the 1980s. The land had been bought by Blue Metal & Gravel (BMG Resources Ltd.) who also owned the quarry on the opposite southern side of Waterworks Road, (where The Gap Tavern stands today) with the intention of quarrying the site. In the 1970s there was enormous opposition to the quarry on the southern side of the road and BMG made the decision not to quarry the St Johns Wood site. Several attempts were made to subdivide the land including one in which it was to be subdivided into 60 townhouse sites. When these attempts proved fruitless the land was put up for sale and was purchased in 1984 by local real estate agent Syd Appleby and his wife Merryl and Allan and Maree Rainbow. They initially subdivided the land into 23 lots with the Applebys and the Rainbows retaining the largest two lots of 2.5 acres each in the north-western corner. The first purchasers of the subdivided land were airline pilot, Richard Kleeman and his wife Sue and Professor Peter Coaldrake and his wife Dr. Lee Coaldrake. Soon after their houses were built and they moved in, the Coaldrakes and the Applebys traded houses, with the Coaldrakes then owning the larger block in the north west corner next to the Rainbows. In 1991, the Coaldrakes and Rainbows decided to subdivide their two lots into six lots. Their properties had access with two other lots under a reciprocal easement arrangement. One of the owners demanded one hundred and thirty thousand dollars on payment to allow the subdivision to proceed without challenge. When this demand was rejected the owner took the matter to the Supreme Court where she lost the case. She continued to demand the money and appealed the court decision. This decision was upheld and the case proceeded to the High Court where it was again upheld. This case became and remains a landmark case on easements in Australian and British law. The issue was: When a dominant block is subdivided does each of the subdivided parts gain the benefit of the easement? The High Court held that it did only if it was of benefit to the subdivided parts. They emphasised the point that an easement is not a personal right, it belongs to land, it attaches to dominant land for the benefit of that land. If it benefits each of the subdivided parts, it is attached to them and does belong to them.

St. John's Wood Hill Certificate of Title issued to BMG Resources Ltd. on 20 April 1966

Original St. John's Wood Hill subdivision plan submitted to Brisbane City Council.

St. John's Wood Hill Brisbane City Council subdivision approval with conditions granted to C. S. & M. L. Appleby and M. E. Rainbow on 14 October 1985.

St. John's Wood Hill 'Land for Sale' Advertisement in the local Westside News, Wednesday 23 July 1986.

== Locality amalgamation into the Suburb of Ashgrove ==
Along with Dorrington, St Johns Wood as a suburb in its own right ceased when it was absorbed into Ashgrove in 1975. Although to this day, these locality names seem to be in such common use that they may not be lost at all, as many residents still associate their residence locations with those former names.

== Architecture ==
St Johns Wood consists of predominantly detached housing. The "Granite House" is the original homestead in St Johns Wood. It is significant for its rarity because it is an 1860s house built primarily of granite quarried in the vicinity. The 1860s stone residence is significant for its aesthetic quality, craftsmanship and intactness, including the internal cedar joinery, skylight, plaster ceiling roses, stonework and original beech floors. The house and grounds are significant also for their landmark quality. It was added to the Queensland Heritage Register in June 2000. There are a number of pre-war "Queenslander" and "Ashgrovian" style houses that were built before the building boom of the post-war era, which resulted in many post-war style houses to be built. Some owners lived on-site in primitive single room dongas (ex-army huts) for the duration of the construction of the main house, sometimes a number of years. (Note: Dated photographs indicate that the owners of 80 St Johns Avenue built their donga in 1946 and the house was completed in 1949. Aerial photographs taken in 1946 indicate a number of dongas on various properties.) In the 1960s and 1970s some new streets were developed and the architecture of those homes reflect the building style of that era. It was during this time that the Enoggera Barracks built a small number of brick and tile homes in land bordering their Barracks for their personnel, however these are all now privately owned. (Note: The Defence Housing Authority auctioned all of the houses in 2007. Source: RPData property search) In recent times gentrification has resulted in houses that have been either significantly renovated or demolished to make way for a contemporary new house.

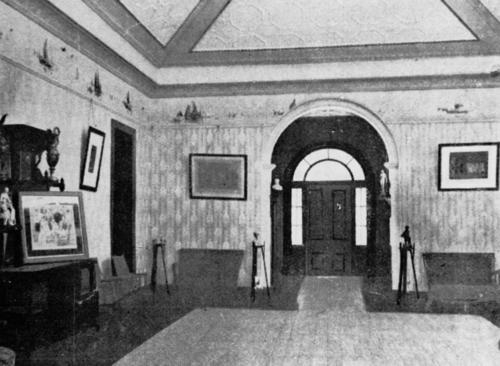
The ballroom in the heritage-listed Granite House Circa 1924

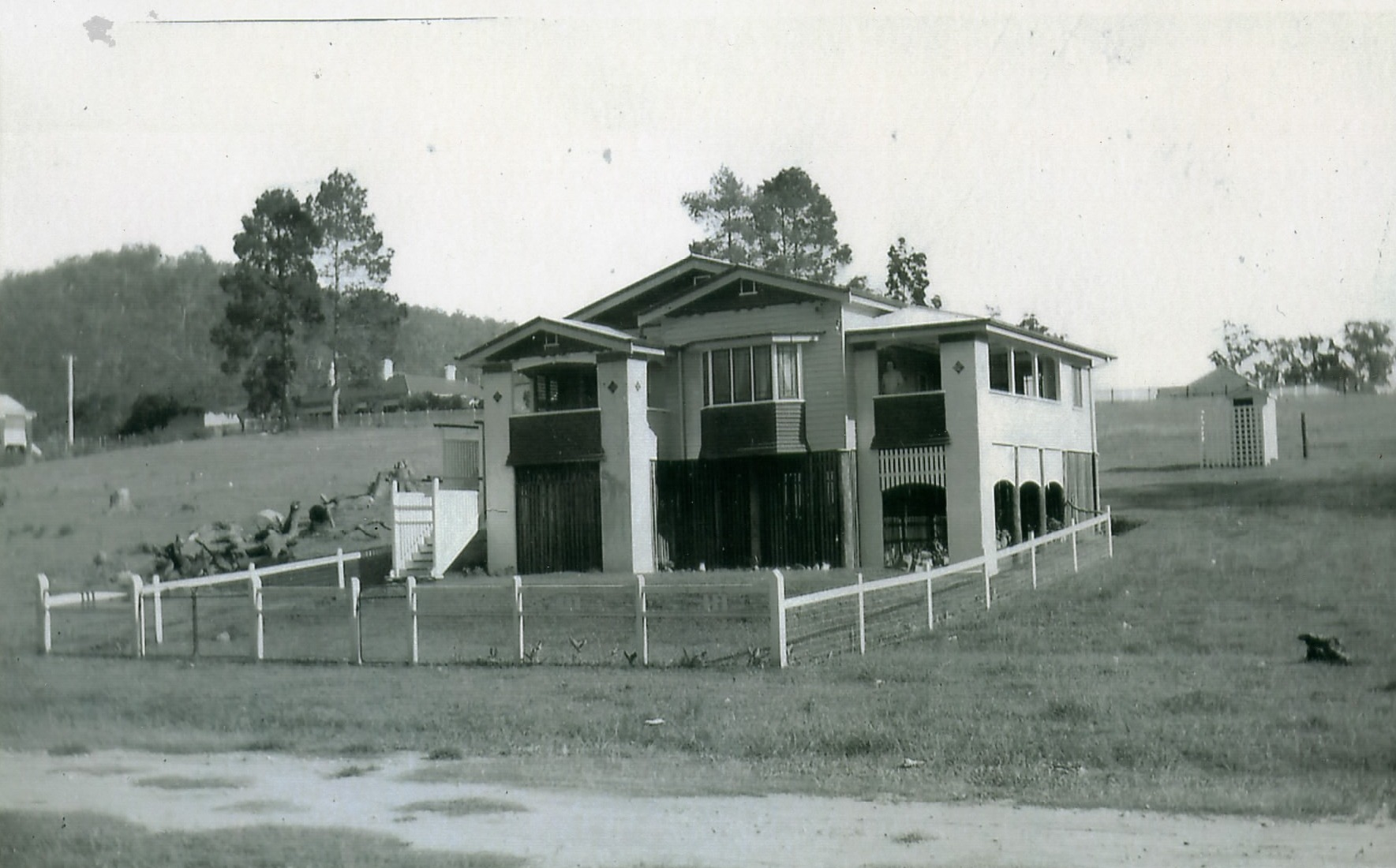
Early Ashgrovian architecture- 71 Royal Pde 1937

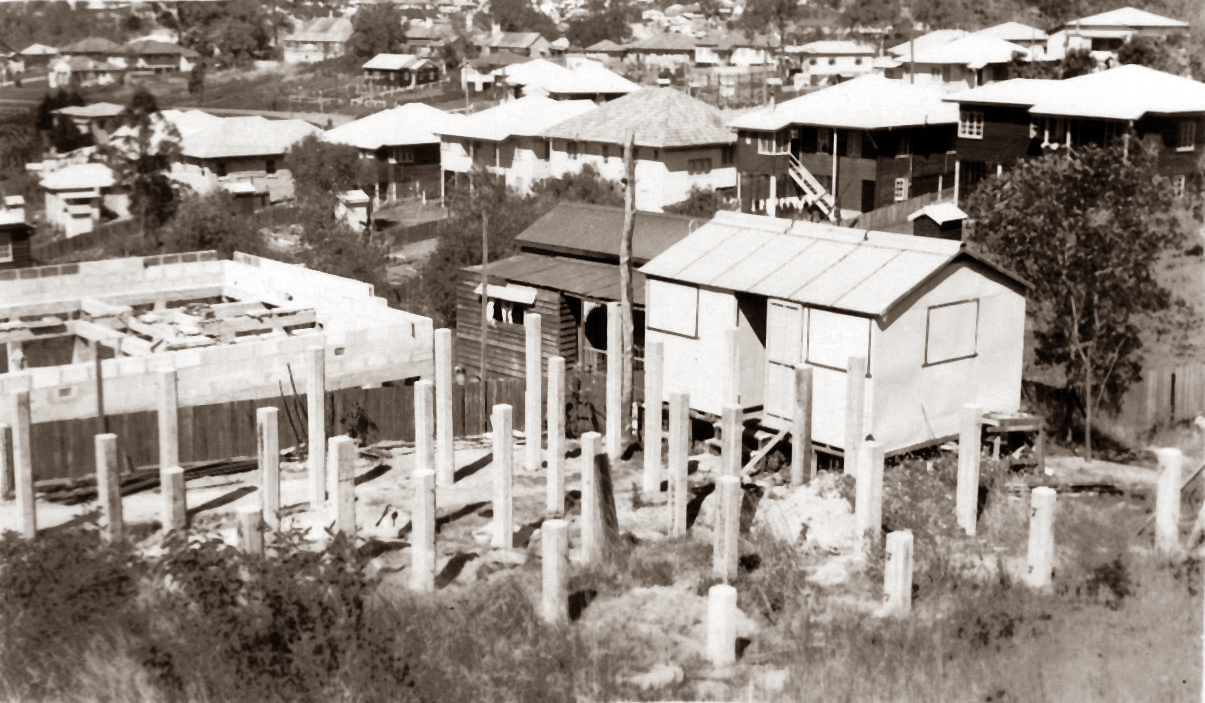
80 St Johns Ave under construction 1948. Ex army hut used as temporary accommodation.

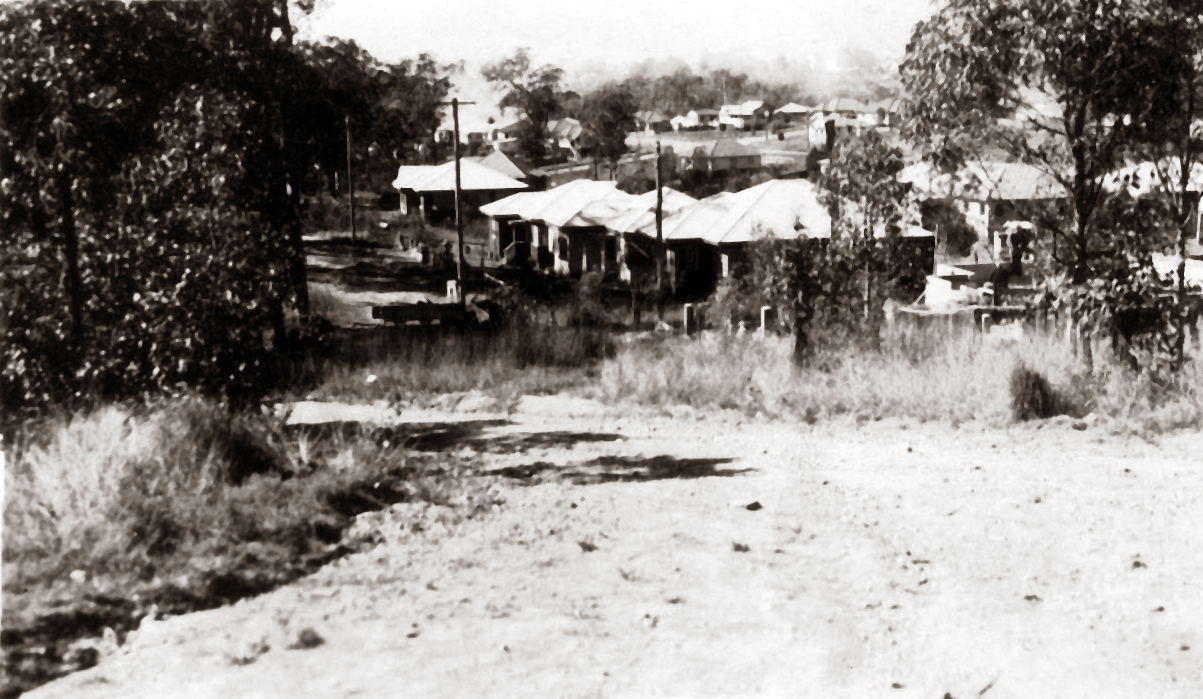
Looking down St Johns Ave 1948

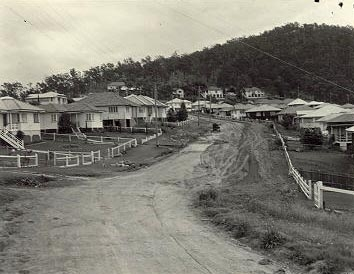
Looking up Buckingham Street 1954

== Community groups ==
=== St John's Wood sustainability ===
St John's Wood Sustainability is "acting locally" to encourage and support:

- re-localising our lives (business, leisure)
- ethical buying (including food)
- organic local food growing
- recycling and pooling resources
- biodiversity – animals and plants
- green energy technologies
- clean creeks, tree planting
- understanding global warming / climate change issues
- lobbying government and business
- sense of community

=== St John's Wood History Group ===
The group consists of interested locals who strive to explore and preserve the unique story of St John's Wood. They meet regularly to report on current historical projects.

=== Save Our Waterways Now ===
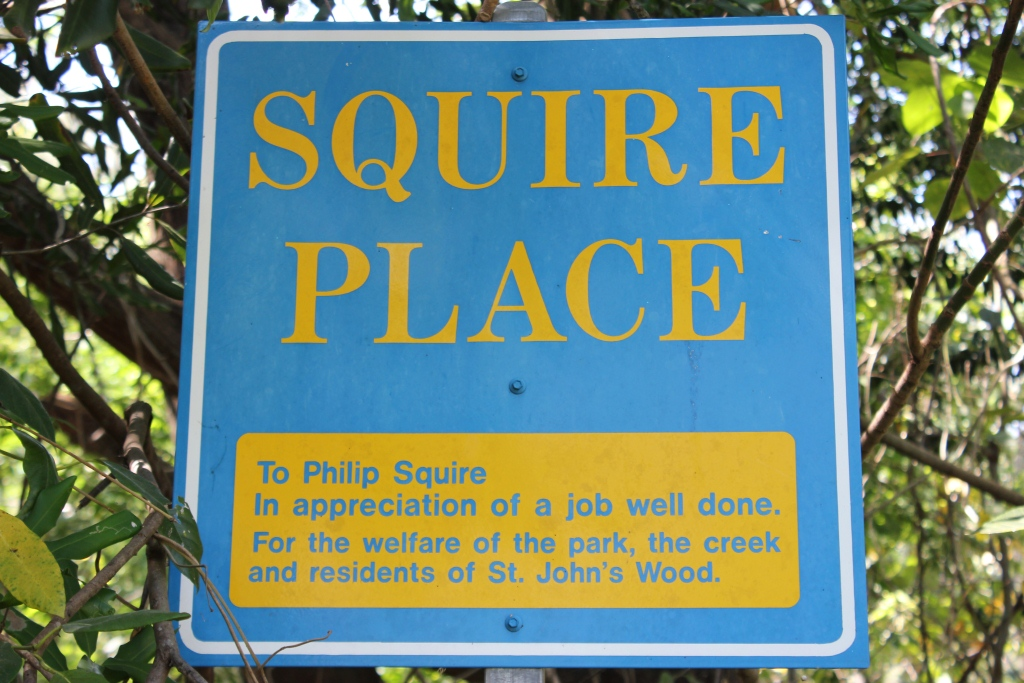
Community appreciation for creek restoration efforts by St Johns Wood resident Philip Squire.

Save Our Waterways Now (SOWN) is a community organisation working to restore the habitats of creeks, including Enoggera Creek. The organisation is supported by the Brisbane City Council through its Habitat Brisbane Program and Water Resources. Save Our Waterways Now aims to:

- restore catchment health and biodiversity
- provide a best practice working model for catchment group activities
- increase community awareness, understanding and participation
- support and encourage member activities and involvement.

SOWN is very involved in the community and undertakes a range of activities to improve the health of the local waterways.

== Transport ==
St Johns Wood has a regular bus service, run by Transport for Brisbane. Commuters have a choice of four bus stops within St Johns Wood or can utilise bus services on Waterworks Road.

== Bibliography ==
- MacArthur, Roy; Gap Pioneer and History Group (2005), Enoggera Creek and me : from the Dam to St Johns Wood, The Gap Pioneer and History Group Inc, ISBN 978-0-9757412-1-4
- "The Western Echo". Hot Metal Publications. March 2012: 27. ISSN 1327-676X.
- "The Western Echo". Hot Metal Publications. May 2012: 39. ISSN 1327-676X.
- Petrie, Constance Campbell; Petrie, Tom, 1831–1910 (1992), Tom Petrie's reminiscences of early Queensland (4th ed.), University of Queensland Press, ISBN 978-0-7022-2383-9
- Shaw, Barry, 1947–; Brisbane History Group (2010), Brisbane : people and places of Ashgrove (1st ed.), Brisbane History Group, ISBN 978-0-9751793-6-9
- Paten, Dick; Ashgrove Historical Society (2010), Ashgrove and The Gap : aspects of history 1849–2003: land, access, institutions and people, Ashgrove Historical Society Inc, ISBN 978-0-646-53532-6
- Argyle, C. J. (Christopher J.) (1980), Chronology of World War II, Marshall Cavendish; New York : Exeter Books, ISBN 978-0-89673-071-7
- "Know your creek. Breakfast-Enoggera Creek" (PDF). Brisbane City Council. 2010.
