= George Rogers Harding =

Australian judge (1838–1895)

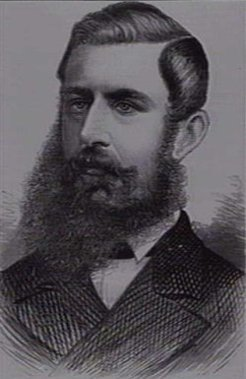
George Rogers Harding (1838-1895)

Judge George Rogers Harding (3 December 1838 – 31 August 1895) was a Queensland judge and the founder of the Ashgrove locality St Johns Wood, in Brisbane, Australia.

== Early life ==
George Rogers Harding was the only son of an English vicar. He was born in Taunton, in Somerset, England on 3 December 1838. His father, also George Rogers Harding, was the vicar at the Rectory of Gittisham, a parish situated on the road between Honiton and Exeter, in county Devon, England. The church, which still stands today, is a fifteenth to sixteenth century building with an attractive stone edifice and the river Otter flowing through its village. When Harding grew up there, the population was only small, at approximately 350 people. Harding had two neighbours who were retired judges: one was Mr. Justice Coleridge (father of Lord Coleridge) and the other was Mr. Justice Pattison The latter gentleman inspired Harding to the legal profession. It was the village life that nurtured his love of books and literature.

On leaving the university, he entered chambers with R. G. Welford, a well-known equity draftsman and conveyancer, who later became a County Court Judge in the Birmingham District. His son, Dick, later owned Welford Downs in Queensland and was killed by the local aborigines. Dick Welford and Harding were students together under the father.

Harding was called to the Bar in 1861 but the year prior to this, he wrote and had published his first law book, A Handy Book of Ecclesiastical Law. The success of the book, before he was called to the Bar, demonstrates the intellectual ability and the professionalism of the young lawyer. The first edition was sold out in nine months and the second edition was sold out before he left for Australia in 1866.

In his reminiscences interviews Mr. Justice Harding revealed several other pastimes that he enjoyed besides writing and boxing. "A great source of amusement during my spare hours was archery. He was a member of the Royal Toxophilite Society, which had grounds in Regent Park in London (tennis courts occupy the site today). Harding and his friends wore traditional cut, green coats, white waistcoats, green caps and brass buttons with the motto "Centurm Pete."(Aim at a certain end). The losers paid for the brew of shandygaff that they drank throughout the game.

George Harding enjoyed the theatre and regularly attended her Majesty's Opera House. In 1862 he was present for the opening of the International Exhibition in London, which he described as being chaotic. His other great passion was debating. He formed the Lincoln's Inn Debating Society while a student there. "We commenced some twenty of us, in a room over Bunton's coffee shop." They debated topical questions as they sat around drinking coffee, tea and smoking tobacco. By the time that Harding left England, the numbers had reached over two hundred and the venue had been changed to the hall of Lion's Inn (which was later demolished). Mr. Justice Harding reveals his associates at these debates as other noteworthy Colonial gentleman, namely, Sir George Innes, who was in 1865 the Justice of the Supreme Court of New South Wales, A Beckett of the Bench of the Supreme Court of Victoria and C. N. Wharton an ex- Attorney-General of Western Australia.

== Marriage and migration ==
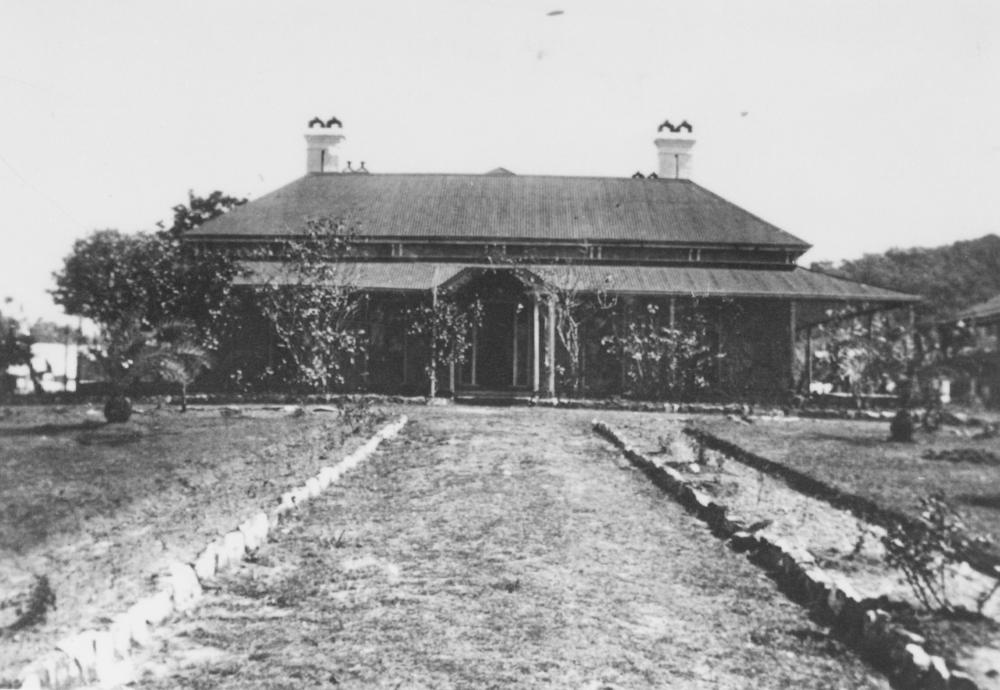
Gravel drive up to the front of St Johns Wood. The garden has rose bushes and climbing plants on the verandah posts. Circa 1929

During the northern spring of 1861, after his calling to the Bar, he married Emily Morris, daughter of Thomas Morris, Esq., of Stone House, Worcestershire. Her father was an ironmaster and she was his fourth daughter. Emily's sister, Mary Ann Rebecca, had married Eyles Irwin Caulfield Browne, also a lawyer, in 1853. The Brownes had sailed to Australia in 1857 arriving in Sydney before moving to Newcastle. They moved to Brisbane in 1860 and Eyles Browne went into a successful partnership with Robert Little, crown solicitor, from 1863 to 1882, and in 1873 entered the world of newspapers when he, Gresley Lukin and W. Thornton formed the Brisbane Newspaper Co, they bought The Brisbane Courier and The Queenslander for £15,000. George and Emily Harding joined the Brownes in Brisbane in 1866.

The Hardings departed on 21 July 1866 from England and sailed aboard the Queen of the Colonies arriving in Brisbane on 14 October 1866. Three daughters, Emily, Fran and Rose, and a servant Mrs. Mary King emigrated with George and Emily.

They had fifteen children but only twelve survived. They were Emily Georgina, Frances Flora Elizabeth, Rose Mary, Ada Ethel, George Rogers, Josephine Mehetabel, Walter Charles, Francis Arundel, Gwendoline Winnifred, Lucy Gertrude, Maud Matilda, and William Thomas Amyas. Two males and one female did not survive.

== St John's Wood House ==
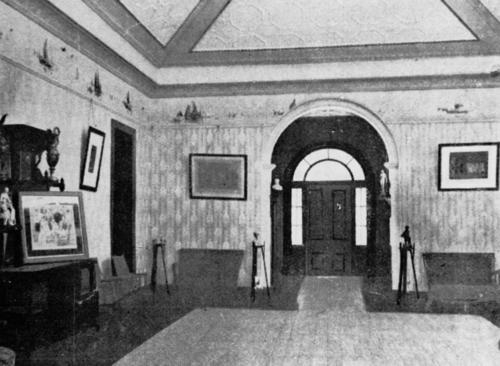
The ballroom inside Granite House where guests were entertained circa 1924

Daniel Rowntree Somerset, Registrar of Pensions, leased Portions 164, 165 & 381, which included St John's Wood (known now as Granite House from the materials used in its construction) to George Rogers Harding in May 1868. Harding proceeded to purchase the property by 27 January 1874. He developed the 75 acres (30 ha) stretching back to Taylor Range, across to Bailey's quarry and Trouton's old residence at Ashgrove to Sir Charles Lilley's quarry and the Glenlyon Estate. He extended the house, adding a ballroom by infilling the space between the two wings, constructed a separate adjacent building consisting mostly of bedrooms, stables were added, quarters for men and maids and a fruit grove established. (Note: Clipping from Ashgrove Library.) The original property comprised a drawing room, dining room, large hall, smaller hall, library, "best" bedroom, dressing room, bachelor's room, seven other bedrooms, pantry, lumber room, two servants' rooms, kitchen, laundry and stables. Some of these rooms would have been in an adjacent building known as the "Cedar House". It was moved in 1926 to an adjacent site and shortly afterwards accidentally burnt down.

=== Entertainment at St John's Wood House ===
A comparison between the ballroom in 1924 and its current state

The Harding family entertained extensively in their home and were well known for the banquets and entertainment that they provided. There is a copy of a banquet menu from 26 November 1884, where the guests had six courses, liqueurs, claret, and coffee. At another function on 23 June 1881, between 1.30–6.30pm they were entertained by an Austrian Band and dancing and in August 1881, the Hardings held a Masquerade Dance in their Ball Room. Since the 1930s there have been reports that the Hardings entertained Prince Albert and Prince George on their visit to Brisbane in 1881. The young Princes are reported as having spent most of their leisure at St John's Wood and Ashgrove, riding through the country and fishing on Enoggera dam with the Harding children. No other records could be found to verify this story, although it has become local folklore. The Princes did meet Mr. Justice Harding on their visit to the Supreme Court. They attended the Ministerial Picnic that was held at Enoggera Reservoir 19 August 1881 along with two hundred other guests, who enjoyed the boating and lunch in the large marquee. There is no evidence that on their return to Government House that they visited the Harding residence although they would have passed by the property along Waterworks Road. Even without Royal patronage George Harding's professional status in the community would have made the many functions at his home well attended by Brisbane society.

== Legal career in Brisbane ==
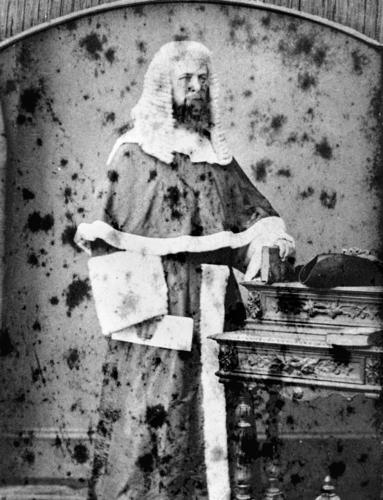
Justice George Rogers Harding, 1879

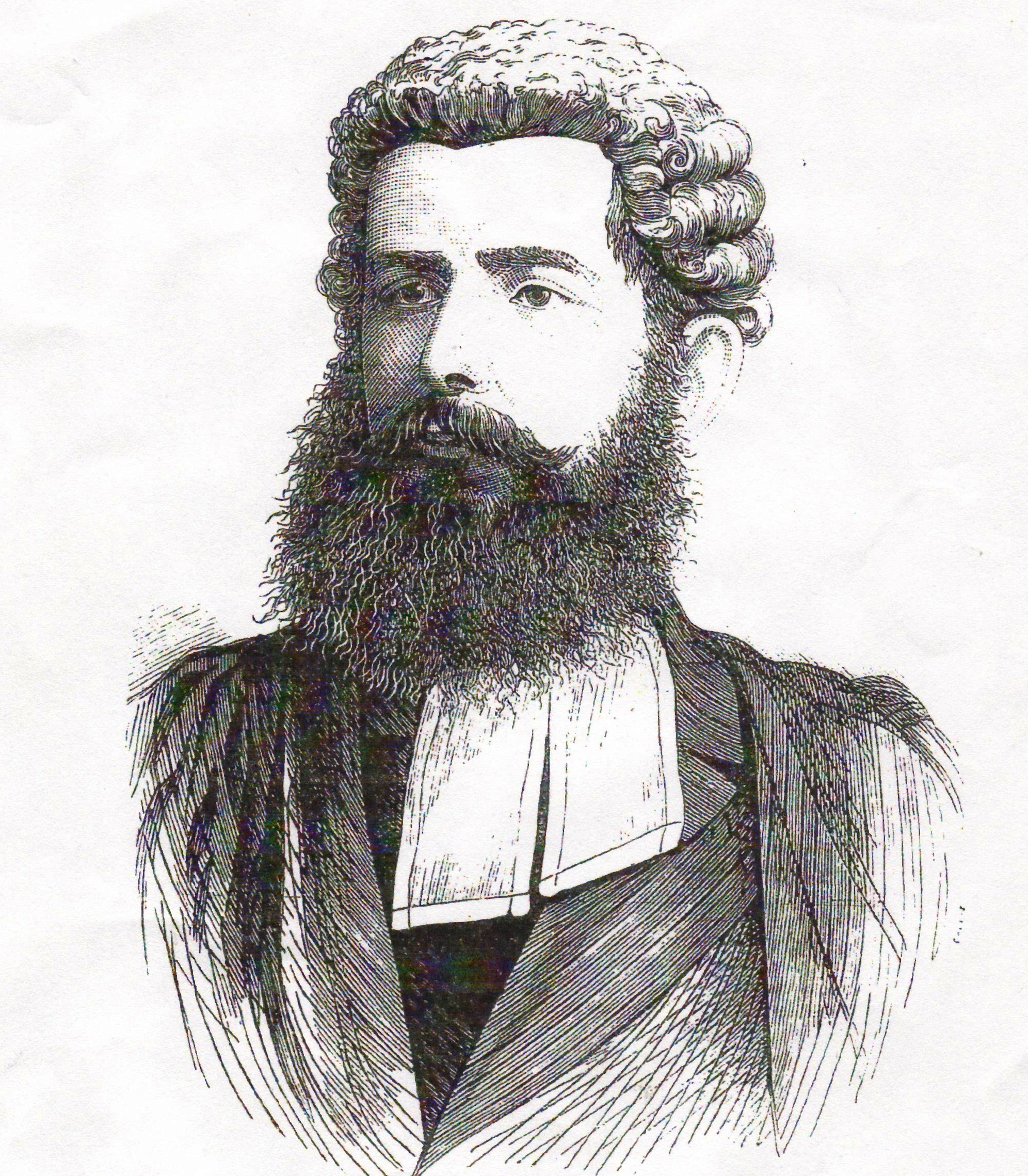
Mr Justice Harding, ATCJ, 16 August 1879

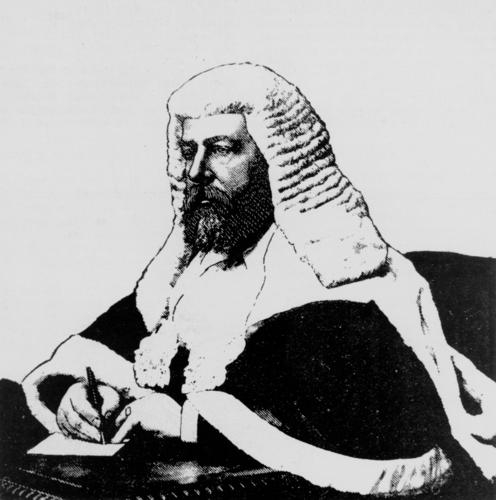
Justice George Rogers Harding, 1895

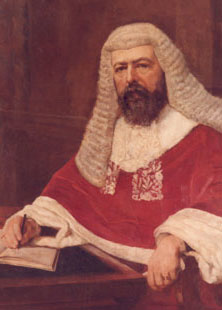
The Hon. George Rogers Harding

He had become the first equity counsel in the colony upon his arrival in 1866 and built up a very large and profitable practice. By 15 July 1879, when he was only forty one years old, he was the senior Puisne Judge of the Supreme Court. He was considered a fair and conscientious man and these qualities lead to him being appointed as Acting Chief Justice in the absence of Sir Charles Lilley from 1883 to 1884. His appointment to the Bench was seen as non-political, "It is not a political appointment in any sense, and that is one fact which entitles it to public approval. Mr. Harding's legal qualifications rank high and socially his standing is unimpeachable."

The only case to make him unpopular was the Conspiracy Trial after the 1891 shearers' strike. The strike involved around 8,000 workers and was largely limited to Queensland. The central issue of the strike was that the pastoralists believed in their right to employ any worker, whether or not they were part of a union, and the Queensland Shearers Union believed that employment of union members only, ensured better working conditions.

== Bibliophile ==
His passion for the law was surpassed by his love for books. His heritage is still seen today in the many books that occupy the Queensland Supreme Court Library. He collected over ten thousand books for the library when he was chairman of its committee from 1887 to 1889 and 1891–1895. "I have always had a great weakness for books, and I think few things have given me more pleasure than the getting together of a library for our Supreme Court. His last interview with R.S. Taylor was conducted on 6 August 1895, just 25 days before his death. Taylor reported descriptively on the Judge's chamber, which gave a clear picture of the room in which the respected gentleman was to spend his last days. Taylor explained how all the chambers of the Judges of the Supreme Court of Queensland were not large nor elaborately fitted out.

"The apartment which Mr. Justice Harding has occupied for many years is comfortable, but the wear of years has told upon the appearance of the furniture. Its chief feature, so far as this article is concerned, is the fine legal library which it contains. The shelves from the floor almost to the ceiling, and even the spaces above the doors, have lately been shelved in. His Honour is simply walled in by his books, and the cry is "still they come".

Harding had a personal law library of 2000 books and over 5000 other miscellaneous books at his St John's Wood home. When he lived in England he enjoyed the library of the British Museum, having a member's ticket and spent many hours in the library of Lincoln's Inn. He wrote six other books after his first one was published in England. They all related to law, involving acts and orders for joint stock companies, jurisdiction, practice and pleading, settled land acts and acts and rules of insolvency.

The last book on insolvency would have provided appropriate information for the administrators of Harding's estate. The judge died intestate and his assets were placed under the administration of George Frederick Scott, the manager of The Union Trustee Company of Australia, Limited on 5 November 1895. The administration took longer than expected as the estate consisted of twelve portions of real estate that were encumbered and twenty-five portions of real estate that were unencumbered. Harding had purchased hundreds of acres of land that stretched across Ashgrove through Ithaca to Fernberg Road. He also had land at Windsor, Red Hill, Yerongpilly, Nerang, Wolston and Cleveland. These properties ranged from one acre lots to twenty-five acre lots. Harding was not alone in his land speculation as many others also bought up holdings of twenty or thirty properties at a time and secured large profits for them. Harding's major creditor was the Queensland National Bank Limited which was owed £21, 914. Unfortunately for the Harding family, the empire that Mr. Justice Harding was building collapsed upon his untimely death.

== Death ==
George Rogers Harding died 31 August 1895 in his chambers in the Supreme Court; he was fifty-six years old. Emily, his first wife had preceded him when she died of heart disease on 11 May 1889. Emily was only forty-nine years old and had been sick for twelve months prior to her death. The Judge married Isabella Smellie Grahame on 23 December 1889. Her sister, Barbara Jane, was married to Edward Robert Drury, a banker and soldier who became the Manager of the Queensland National Bank Limited and made advances without consulting the directors and concealing accounts from the board. He would have been the person who lent George Harding his money for his property speculation. Isabella had been a forty-five-year-old spinster when she married. She was left with six of Harding's children who were still living at home; the youngest being William at thirteen years and the eldest being Josephine at twenty-five years.

On 27 August 1895 Harding was hearing the case of Kinivan vs. Clelland before a jury of four. He considered the case trivial and, as was his way, he wanted it closed as soon as possible as he did not advocate wasting the money of either the public or the court over litigation. The hearing was over a contract for felling and hauling timber for a building on Woolirina Station in the Maranoa district. Judge Harding took ill the following day, Wednesday, he stayed in his chambers overnight. By the Thursday morning at ten o'clock, he took the summing up in his chamber with the counsel and jurors present. At three o'clock that afternoon Mr. Justice Beal, who had taken over the summation from the ill judge was advised by the doctors attending Harding that he was no longer to have communication with the Court office. Harding succumbed to his illness forty-eight hours later at three o'clock on the afternoon of Saturday 31 August 1895.

His death certificate stated that he died from gout of the heart and kidneys, suppression of urine, and heart failure. He never wished to waste court time by calling for a bathroom recess; he would try to contain his bladder. This unusual habit was to be the cause of his illness. He was buried at Toowong Cemetery (beside Emily) on Sunday afternoon, 1 September 1895, after a public funeral that was attended by every class in the community.

The eulogies recorded in The Brisbane Courier after his death extolled his work ethic, his intellect, his friendliness and his kindness although it was mentioned that he did have peculiarities and eccentricities that would fade with time from people's memories. The judicial bench and the legal profession paid their respects to Mr. Justice Harding in the Supreme Court on 3 September. The judges wore black robes and white armbands in lieu of their state robes. The courtroom was filled with the profession and the public and it was noted that many ladies, such as Lady Lilley and Mrs. Virgil Power, were present.

Harding's life gives an insight into the more genteel aspects of Brisbane society before the turn of the century. The accumulation of wealth and establishment of social credibility was important within his personal community. He was not prepared financially or personally for his death, leaving large debts and no will, which caused the disintegration of most of the achievements that he had worked for, in his new country. Fortunately, his contribution to the Supreme Court Library stands as a monument to his generosity, intellect and especially his love of books.

Spencer Browne's words are a fitting epitaph to George Roger Harding:

I salute the memory of Mr. Justice Harding – strict, often severe, always with the grandly manner but a brilliant and upright judge.

== List of George Rogers Harding's published books ==
- Harding, George R (1862), A Handy book of ecclesiastical law : especially adapted for the use of the clergy and solicitors (2nd ed.), Crockford
- Harding, George R (1887), The Acts and orders relating to the jurisdiction, practice, and pleading of the Supreme Court of Queensland (on the Crown side) : arranged with notes, James C. Beal, Govt. Pr
- Harding, George R (1895), The acts and orders relating to joint stock companies since 1887, Watson, Ferguson & Co
- Harding, George R; Macpherson, P; Queensland. Supreme Court. Rules (1887), The acts and rules relating to insolvency, Watson, Ferguson
- Harding, George R (1889), The Settled Land Act of 1886 and the rules of court made thereunder with notes, James C. Beal, Govt. Printer
- Harding, George R (1895), The acts and orders relating to joint stock companies, Watson, Ferguson & Co

== Bibliography ==
- Carter, M (1972). "Harding, George Rogers (1838–1895)". Australian Dictionary of Biography, National Centre of Biography, Australian National University.
- Browne, Spencer (1927), A journalist's memories, Read Press
