= Enoggera =

Enoggera may refer to:

- Enoggera, Queensland, a suburb of Brisbane, in Queensland, Australia
  - Enoggera Barracks, an Australian Army base in the suburb
  - Enoggera Hill, hill in the suburb
  - Enoggera railway station, railway station in the suburb
- Enoggera Reservoir, Queensland, a suburb of Brisbane, in Queensland, Australia
  - Enoggera Dam, a dam in the suburb
- Enoggera Creek, a creek in Queensland, Australia
- Enoggera Road, Brisbane, a road in Brisbane, Queensland, Australia
- Shire of Enoggera, a former local government area in Queensland, Australia
- Enoggera (wasp), a wasp genus in the family Pteromalidae
