= Waterworks Road =

Arterial road in Brisbane, Australia

Waterworks Road Queensland
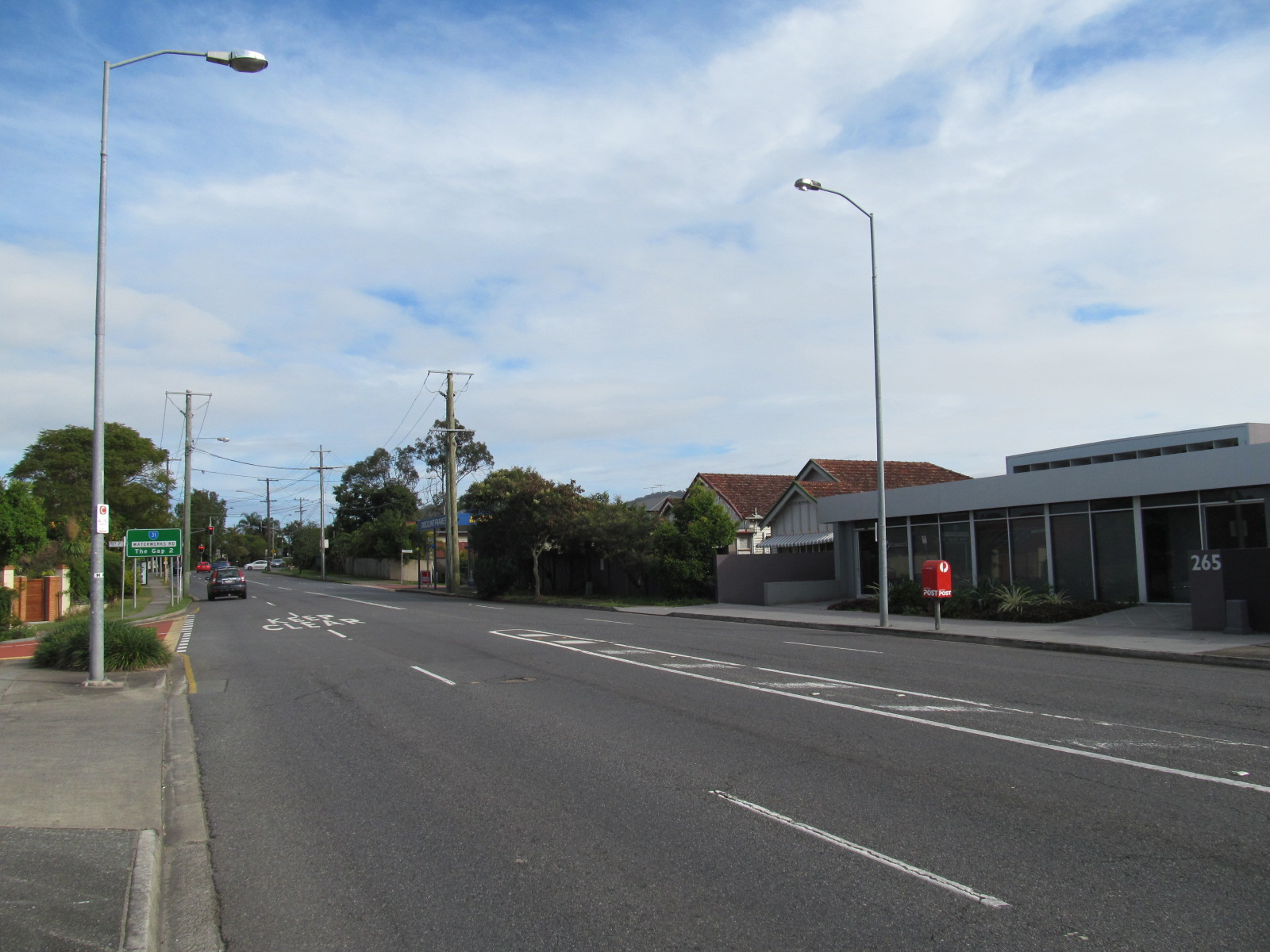
- Waterworks Road at Ashgrove

General information
- Type: Road
- Length: 8.5 km (5.3 mi)
- Route number(s): State Route 31

Major junctions
- East end: Musgrave Road, Red Hill
- Jubilee Terrace; Settlement Road
- West end: Mount Nebo Road, The Gap

Location(s)
- Major suburbs: Red Hill, Ashgrove, The Gap

Waterworks Road is an 8.5 km (5.3 mi) arterial road in Brisbane, Queensland, Australia. It is currently signed as State Route 31 for its entire length. Waterworks Road transports traffic between the Brisbane central business district and western suburbs such as Red Hill, Ashgrove and The Gap.

== History ==
Waterworks Road was built on a Turrbal pathway that led to Mount Coot-tha – a place of the honey-bee Dreaming.

It was surveyed and named in 1864 as a direct route to the site of the Enoggera Dam, which was built from 1864 to 1866.

A small Catholic Church was built on Waterworks Road in 1921, and St Finbarr’s Catholic primary school in 1925. The tram line was extended from Red Hill to Jubilee Terrace in 1924, and then to Coopers Camp Road in 1935. This line operated continuously until it was closed in 1969. Examples of 1920s and later trams are shown.

== Route ==
Connecting to the terminus of Musgrave Road (which leads into the city), Waterworks Road begins as a four-lane road in Red Hill. The road then leads into the central section of Ashgrove and intersects with major roads such as Jubilee Terrace and Stewart Road. Once the road reaches West Ashgrove, it is divided into two roads; the inbound road being Glory Street. After intersecting Coopers Camp Road, Waterworks Road forms back into a single, four-lane road and continues into The Gap. Once in The Gap, Waterworks Road intersects with Settlement Road, which connects traffic from The Gap to Keperra. Following this major intersection, Waterworks Road becomes a two-lane road and terminates at The Gap Park 'n' Ride. It connects to Mount Nebo Road, which travels to rural suburbs Mount Nebo and Mount Glorious.

In most sections of the road, there is a T2 Lane which operates between 7 and 9am on weekdays.

== Terrain ==
From Musgrave Road, Waterworks Road descends the north-western slope of Red Hill until it crosses Ithaca Creek. It then climbs to the ridge line between Ithaca Creek and Enoggera Creek, and continues west to the Coopers Camp Road intersection. From there it descends rapidly into the Enoggera Creek valley and proceeds west into the gap between the Taylor Range to the north and Mount Coot-tha to the south. After crossing Enoggera Creek at Walton Bridge it follows the ridge line between Enoggera Creek and Fish Creek to its transition to Mt Nebo Road.

== Upgrade ==
In 2018, it was proposed that Waterworks Road required an upgrade between Trout Street and Beth Eden Terrace in Ashgrove to improve traffic efficiency, reduce congestion and improve safety of road users. The upgrade includes the addition of a secondary right-turn lane on the Waterworks Road – Stewart Road intersection, the addition of a left-turn lane on the Waterworks Road – Ashgrove Avenue intersection and the relocation of Bus stop 16 on Waterworks Road. Construction began in April 2019.

== Local heritage places ==
The Brisbane City Council has defined a number of local heritage places in Waterworks Road under the Queensland Heritage Act 1992. They are:

- Stewart Place (including war memorial and tram shelter)
- Residences at 150 and 180 Waterworks Road
- Churches at 202 and 290 Waterworks Road
- Ashgrove Private Hospital (former)
- Montvue Buildings
- Ithaca Bridge
- Two tram shelters (example shown)

== Major intersections ==
The entire road is in the Brisbane local government area.

Location	km	mi	Destinations	Notes
Red Hill	0	0.0	Musgrave Road (State Route 31) runs south–east through Red Hill, and Enoggera Terrace runs south–west to Paddington	Eastern end of Waterworks Road (State Route 31); T2 lane begins.
Ithaca Creek	0.6	0.37	Ithaca Bridge	
Ashgrove	1.4	0.87	Ashgrove Avenue runs north to Newmarket	T2 lane ends.
Ashgrove	1.6	0.99	Stewart Road runs north–west to Enoggera	
Ashgrove	1.9	1.2	Jubilee Terrace (Metroad 5) runs south to Bardon, and north to Enoggera (via Stewart Road)	T2 lane begins.
Ashgrove	3.2	2.0	Coopers Camp Road runs south to Bardon	
Enoggera Creek	5.7	3.5	Walton Bridge	
The Gap	6.7	4.2	Settlement Road (State Route 40) runs north to Keperra	T2 lane ends.
Enoggera Reservoir / The Gap midpoint	8.5	5.3	Mount Nebo Road (State Route 31) runs north–west to Mount Nebo	Western end of Waterworks Road.
1.000 mi = 1.609 km; 1.000 km = 0.621 mi

== See also ==
- Waterworks (an article about water supply)
