= Taylor Range =

Mountain range in Queensland, Australia

Taylor
- Herbert Taylor, Glenmorrison
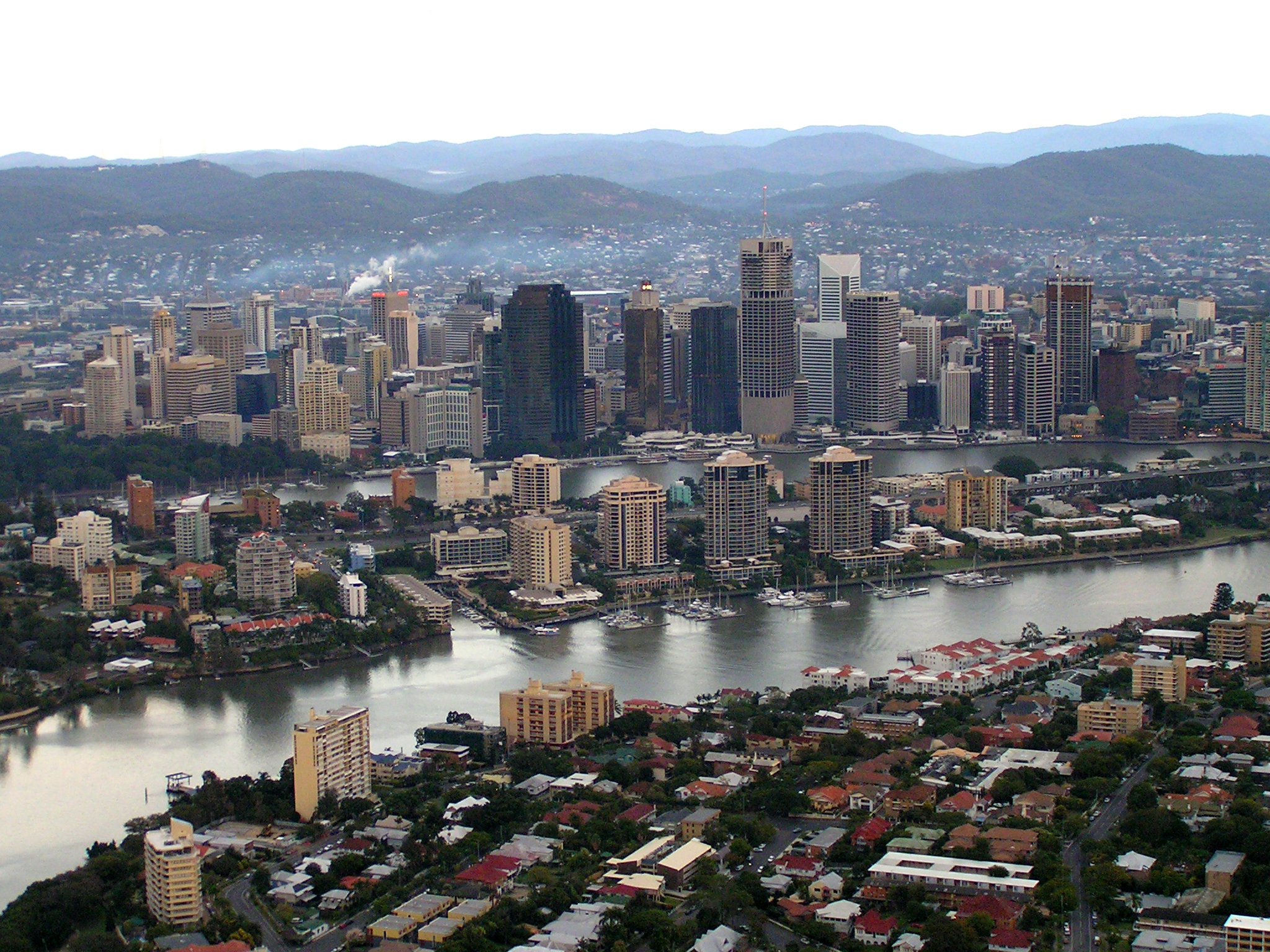
- Brisbane lies on the southern slopes of the range

Highest point
- Peak: Mount Coot-tha
- Elevation: 287 m (942 ft)

Geography
- Location within Queensland
- Country: Australia
- State: Queensland
- Region: South East Queensland
- Municipality: Brisbane
- Range coordinates: 27°29.1′S 152°57.6′E
- Parent range: D'Aguilar Range

The Taylor Range or Herbert Taylor Range is a mountain range on the western edge of Brisbane, Queensland, Australia. It was first named The Glenmorrison Range by John Oxley during his exploration of the area in January 1824. In 1828, the colonial botanist Charles Fraser, whilst looking at the range from the Ipswich area, noted the bearings as Sir Herbert Taylor’s Range from which the current name derived.

The range is an eastern spur at the southern end of the D'Aguilar Range. The section of the range north of Enoggera Creek (sometimes called the Enoggera side of the range) includes the Keperra Bushland, Enoggera Military Area and the Ashgrove Golf Club golf course. Most of the range south of Enoggera Creek (the Mt Coot-tha side) is covered by the protected area of Mt Coot-tha Reserve (or Mt Coot-tha Forest). The two sections of the range separate at Enoggera Reservoir and circle the crater shaped suburb of The Gap like the claws of a crab, leaving a narrow entrance via Waterworks Road from the east (this being ‘the gap’ from which the suburb got its name).

The Enoggera side of the range is bound on the north by the upper end of the Kedron Brook catchment area which includes the tributary of Cedar Creek. Enoggera Creek and its tributaries, Ithaca Creek (formed by East Ithaca Creek and West Ithaca Creek which join near the Bardon Scenic Reserve), and Fish Creek commencing at Wittonga Park at The Gap, drain the eastern slopes between the Enoggera and Mt Coot-tha sections of the range.

The Mt Coot-tha side of the range is drained on the western slopes by Gap Creek, a tributary of Moggill Creek, and Cubberla Creek which runs south into the Brisbane River. Toowong Creek starts on the eastern slope of Mt Coot-tha and travels through the Brisbane Botanic Gardens on its way to the Brisbane River.

Ithaca Creek was unsuccessfully mined for gold between 1894 and the 1950s. Remnants of the mining operations can be found within Brisbane Forest Park.

== Peaks ==
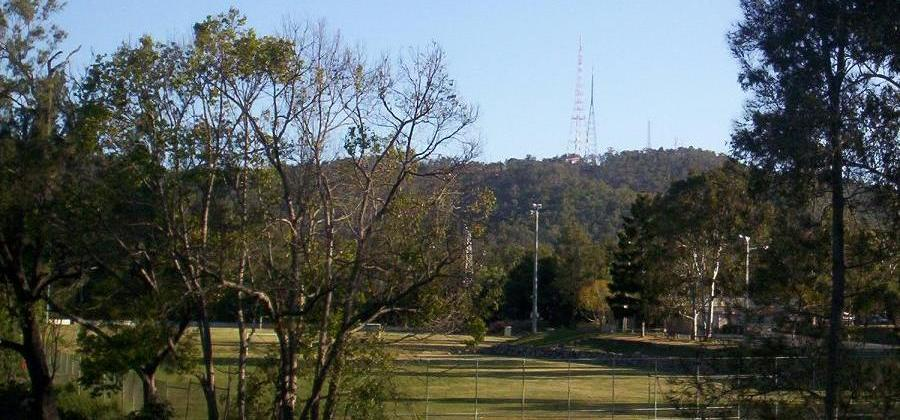
Mount Coot-tha (and TV towers) – as seen from The Gap

Mount Coot-tha, on which there is a lookout, botanical gardens, a planetarium and television towers, has multiple peaks. The highest of these is also the highest peak of the Taylor Range, at 287 m.

Other notable peaks on the mountain include Constitution Hill (263 m elevation) and the lookout at One Tree Hill (226 m elevation).

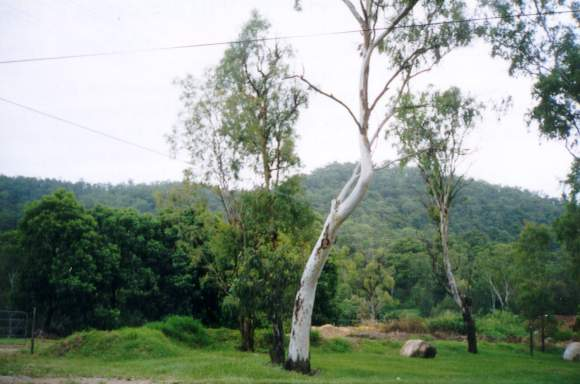
Enoggera Hill, seen from The Gap

Further east along the range is Enoggera Hill (284 m elevation) located within the Enoggera Army Barracks. The range becomes a series of hills through the Brisbane locality of St Johns Wood and the suburbs of Red Hill, Spring Hill to Wickham Terrace in the Brisbane central business district.

== Protected areas ==
Much of the range has been protected in recreation reserves. Early attempts to purchase the land in the 1860s were not permitted by the Surveyor-General, Augustus Charles Gregory, on the basis that the heights would be needed for trigonometrical purposes and for Brisbane residents to visit on account of the views and fresh air.

The public park at the summit of Mount Coot-tha was one of Brisbane's first public parks. It was officially gazetted in 1880 and two years later was visited by Prince George, who later become King George V.

== See also ==
- List of mountains in Australia
