= Save Our Waterways Now =

Environmental rehabilitation organisation in Brisbane, Australia

Mark Crocker, SOWN Community Liaison Officer and Robert Whyte, SOWN Director at Walton Bridge Reserve, Enoggera Creek, The Gap, Brisbane, Queensland, Australia.

Save Our Waterways Now (SOWN) is a community-based organisation rehabilitating Enoggera catchment in Brisbane, the largest city in Queensland, Australia. The principal waterway in the Enoggera catchment is Enoggera Creek with two main tributaries, Fish Creek and Ithaca Creek.

SOWN was incorporated on 18 February 1998 as Save Our Waterways - Now Inc., organisation number IA19057, an association under the jurisdiction of the Office of Fair Trading, Queensland. SOWN was formed as a response to habitat loss and environmental degradation. Enoggera Creek and its tributaries had been degraded by past agricultural land-uses and by the dumping of refuse and garden waste from the homes and developments in the catchment.

SOWN operates a volunteer-run plant nursery which propagates more than 30,000 locally native species every year and provides them free to SOWN members.

== History ==
The first record of major tree planting and habitat restoration in the Enoggera catchment was reported in January 1982 as an activity of Men of the Trees whose newsletter reported "... to date 1,800 trees have been placed, of which about 1,700 have survived.”. Another local group, the Enoggera Creek Beautification Committee, held its first planting on 26 January 1986.

In 1994 Brian Hallinan, Brisbane City Council Alderman for The Gap Ward, created SOWN by bringing together the environmental activists and interested residents as a project of Men of the Trees. The project received National Heritage Trust funding for a coordinator, equipment and expenses.

By the late 1990s SOWN was a major environmental organisation with many restoration sites and active volunteers. On 30 March 1998 in a speech to the Australian Senate, Senator Ian Macdonald reported "the project was developed to provide a working model of waterways management, with an emphasis on ongoing maintenance ... In the last year alone some 20,000 native trees and grasses were planted, with 900 cubic metres of mulch being spread. The strength of the project has been the work by 700 or so volunteers, who have contributed more than 68,000 volunteer hours since the project's inception..."

In 2007, SOWN merged with the Brisbane Rainforest Action and Information Network (BRAIN). In 2008 SOWN launched Ithaca Intact, a flagship project to restore the entire seven kilometre length of Ithaca Creek.
