= M5/A5/Metroad 5 (Brisbane) =

Road route in Brisbane, Queensland

M5/A5 / Metroad 5

Route information
- Length: 43 km (27 mi)
- Existed: 1995 (as Metroad 5)–Partly replaced by alphanumeric route signage since 2006

Location
- Country: Australia

Highway system
- Highways in Australia; National Highway; Freeways in Australia

The M5/A5 / Metroad 5 is a major road corridor in Brisbane, Queensland, Australia, linking the western and southern suburbs from Yamanto and Springfield through Indooroopilly, Toowong, and the northern suburbs to Kedron and the Inner City Bypass. It functions as Brisbane’s primary western bypass of the central business district and incorporates several major freeways and arterial streets.

== Route ==
From south to north:

- Centenary Highway: connects Yamanto to Springfield.
- Centenary Motorway: from Springfield through Jindalee, Darra, and Indooroopilly to the Western Freeway.
- Western Freeway: from Moggill Road (Indooroopilly) to Milton Road (Toowong).
- Legacy Way: toll tunnel connecting Mount Coot-tha to the Inner City Bypass.
- Suburban arterial route via Mount Coot-tha Road, Frederick Street, Rouen Road, Boundary Road, Macgregor Terrace, Jubilee Terrace, Stewart Road, Wardell Street, and Stafford Road through Toowong, Bardon, Ashgrove, Everton Park, Stafford, and Kedron.

This section diverges from the motorway route and serves as a surface arterial continuation of the former Metroad 5 corridor.

== History ==
The route was designated Metroad 5 in 1995 as part of Brisbane’s Metroad system to mark major suburban arterials. Following Queensland’s adoption of alphanumeric route numbering in the 2000s, the southern motorway sections were redesignated as M5 and A5, while some inner sections retained legacy Metroad 5 signage. The opening of the Legacy Way tunnel in June 2015 provided a direct tolled link between the Western Freeway and the Inner City Bypass, completing the modern motorway-standard bypass route.

In the early 1990s, a deviation was constructed to the west parallel to Kaye St at a less steep grade. As part of these changes access to Baroona Rd heading toward the suburb of Rosalie was closed while preserving the existing roundabout.

It was announced that from mid-September 2026, the speed limit between Gerler Street and Rainworth Road would be reduced from 60 km/h to 50 km/h, as this route this section contains an area of higher pedestrian activity and navigates through two elongated roundabouts.

== Major intersections ==
The component roads include the following major junctions:

Motorway section:

- Ipswich Motorway (M2) – Darra
- Logan Motorway (M2/M4) – near Springfield
- Moggill Road – Indooroopilly
- Legacy Way (M5) - Toowong

North-south suburban arterial:

- Milton Road – Toowong
- Latrobe Terrace - Bardon
- Waterworks Road - Ashgrove
- Samford Road - Enoggera
- Everton Park Link Road - Everton Park

East-west along Stafford Road:

- Everton Park Link Road - Everton Park
- Appleby Road - Stafford
- Webster Road - Stafford
- Gympie Road - Kedron
- Airport Link - Kedron (to Eagle Farm and Bowen Hills)

(See detailed junction tables in the respective road articles.)

== Suburban arterial ==
=== Gympie Road to South Pine Road ===
At its north-eastern end, Metroroad 5 is gazetted along the entirety of Stafford Road from its western terminus at Gympie Road to South Pine Road. It consists of four-lane single carriageway for most of its length with median turning lanes at major intersections. This section is primarily lined with residential detached housing, with a section of retail stores between Webster Road and Appleby Road such including Stafford City Shopping Centre. Continuing west the route passes by Everton Park State High School, and Everton Plaza.

=== South Pine Road to Fernberg Road ===
Metroroad 5 continues south along South Pine Road as a four-lane road with a median, crossing over the Kedron Brook park and bikeway. The route then changes name at the intersection of Hurcotte Street, with the South Pine Road name continuing eastward, and Metroroad 5 becoming Wardell St.

Further south, the route proceeds onto an overpass crossing Pickering Street and the Ferny Grove Line just west of Enoggera StationThe route then crosses Enogerra Creek where it then becomes Stewart Road, before turning east along Elimata Drive heading south towards Waterworks Road, From this intersection, Metroroad 5 continues through the suburbs of Ashgrove and Bardon as Jubilee Terrace and crosses Ithaca Creek.

Entering Bardon, the route follows a hilly alignment, where it then meets with Coopers Camp Road and Simpsons Road. From this point the route follows MacGregor Terrace, before becoming Boundary road south of Latrobe Terrace, and runs along the western boundary of Government House. From Coopers Camp Road to Fernberg Road, the speed limit is decreased to 50 km/h before returning to 60 km/h south Fernberg Road.

=== Fernberg Road to the Western Freeway ===
The route continues south past Gerler St, at which point the speed limit is reduced to 50 km/h as it approaches two sets of elongated roundabouts, the southern of which sometimes being referred to as "The Bardon Roundabout" (constructed in the early 1980s), before heading south along an uphill climb as Rouen Road. South of Birdwood Terrace, the route changes name to Frederick St, travelling south in a straight line along the eastern boundary of Toowong Cemetery toward the roundabout at Milton Road and Miskin Street. The route then proceeds for a short distance westward before changing designation to the M5 as the Western Freeway.

== See also ==
- Transport in Brisbane
