= Upper Kedron, Queensland =

Upper Kedron
- Suburb
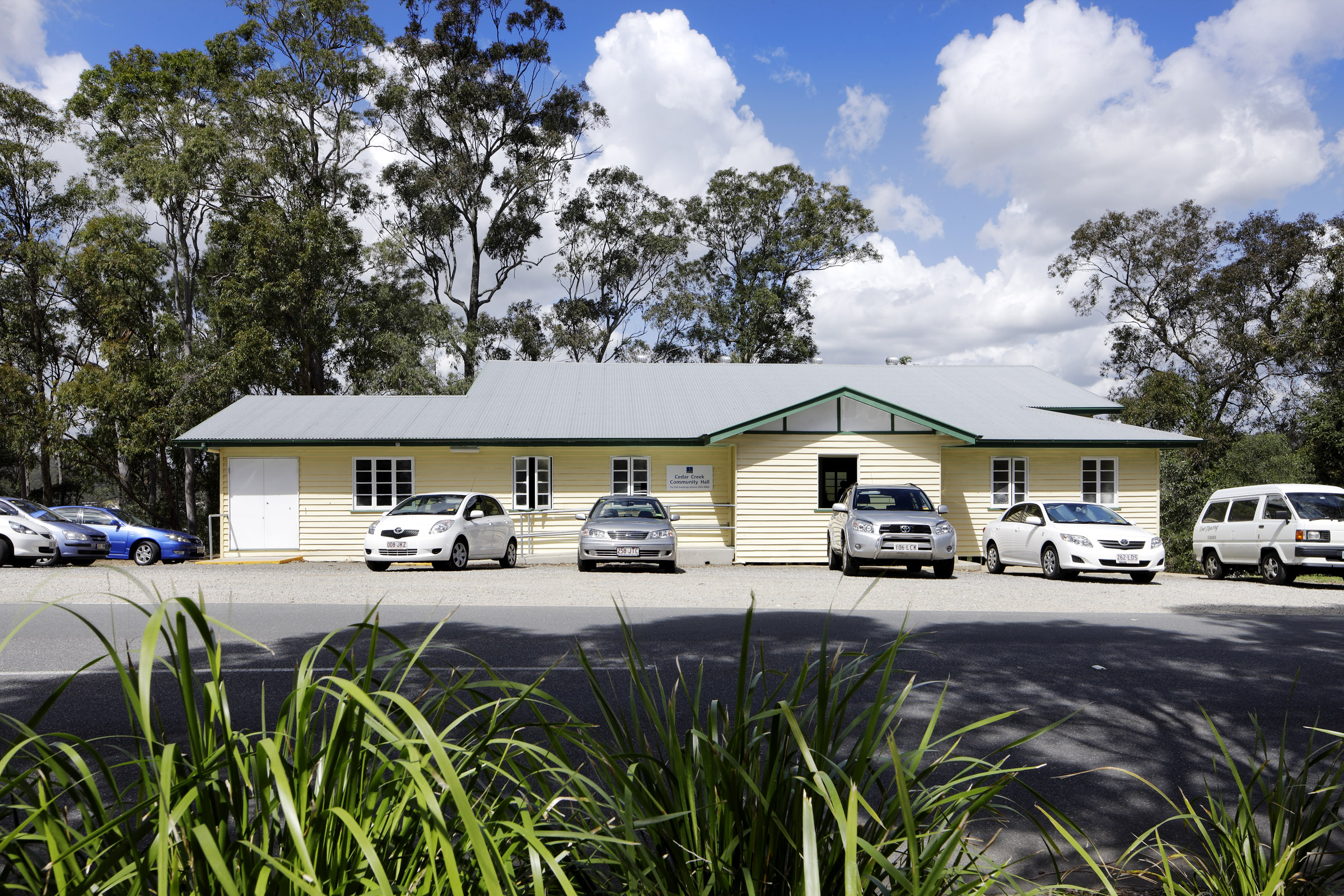
- Upper Kedron Cedar Creek hall

- Interactive map of Upper Kedron
- Coordinates: 27.4188°S 152.9191°E
- Country: Australia
- State: Queensland
- City: Brisbane
- LGA: City of Brisbane (The Gap Ward)
- Location: 15.8 km (9.8 mi) NW of Brisbane CBD

Government
  - State electorate: Ferny Grove
  - Federal division: Ryan

Area
  - Total: 8.7 km^{2} (3.4 sq mi)

Population
  - Total: 5,800 (2021 census)
  - Density: 667/km^{2} (1,727/sq mi)
- Time zone: UTC+10:00 (AEST)
- Postcode: 4055
Suburbs around Upper Kedron
Camp Mountain	Ferny Hills	Ferny Grove
Enoggera Reservoir	Upper Kedron	Keperra
Enoggera Reservoir	Enoggera Reservoir	The Gap

Upper Kedron is an outer north-western suburb in the City of Brisbane, Queensland, Australia. In the 2021 census, Upper Kedron had a population of 5,800 people.

== Geography ==
Upper Kedron is located 12 kilometres (7.5 mi) north-west of the Brisbane CBD. Upper Kedron is a residential suburb on the edge of the Brisbane Forest Park.

The suburb contains the headwaters of the two tributaries of Kedron Brook, namely Kedron Creek and Cedar Creek. Despite the similarity of their names, the Brisbane suburbs of Upper Kedron and Kedron are 15.3 kilometres (9.5 mi) apart.

== History ==
Upper Kedron Hall (27.4128°S 152.9172°E) opened on Cedar Creek Road in 1890.

The Cedar Creek Cemetery (27.4131°S 152.9241°E) opened on Cemetery Road in 1898.

In 2014, Cedar Woods Properties purchased a 228 hectares (560 acres) parcel of land remaining within Upper Kedron for $68 million. Cedar Woods received council approval to develop this into a 900-lot master planned residential community.

== Demographics ==
In the 2011 census, Upper Kedron had a population of 3,432 people, 50.1% female and 49.9% male. The median age of the Upper Kedron population was 31 years, 6 years below the Australian median. 81.3% of people living in Upper Kedron were born in Australia, compared to the national average of 69.8%; the next most common countries of birth were England 5.5%, New Zealand 3%, Scotland 0.6%, South Africa 0.6%, Iran 0.4%. 92.5% of people spoke only English at home; the next most common languages were 0.7% Persian (excluding Dari), 0.4% Italian, 0.3% Assyrian Neo-Aramaic, 0.3% Dutch, 0.3% Sinhalese.

In the 2016 census, Upper Kedron had a population of 4,180 people.

In the 2021 census, Upper Kedron had a population of 5,800 people.

== Development ==
Cedar Woods lodged a Development Application with Brisbane City Council over the Suburb's remaining undeveloped land within the South East Queensland Urban Footprint, noting the council's zones as being inconsistent with the South East Queensland Regional Plan. The development proposes to use an existing road reserve which runs through the property to connect with Mount Nebo Road, and ultimately Waterworks Road.

The proposed 227 hectare development includes 91 hectares of open space and up to 980 individual lots to be developed over a period of 1 decade. The works to develop the site are estimated to cost $900 million, and will generate up to 550 direct jobs.

The proposed development responds to the site's topography by offering a range of living options, ranging from bush blocks, to lots designed for terrace-style dwellings.

== Education ==
There are no schools in Upper Kedron. The nearest government primary and secondary schools are Ferny Grove State School and Ferny Grove State High School, both in neighbouring Ferny Grove to the north-east.
