= Ashgrove Golf Club =

Golf club in Australia

Coordinates: 27.4461°S 152.9601°E

Club information
- Tournaments: Queensland Open

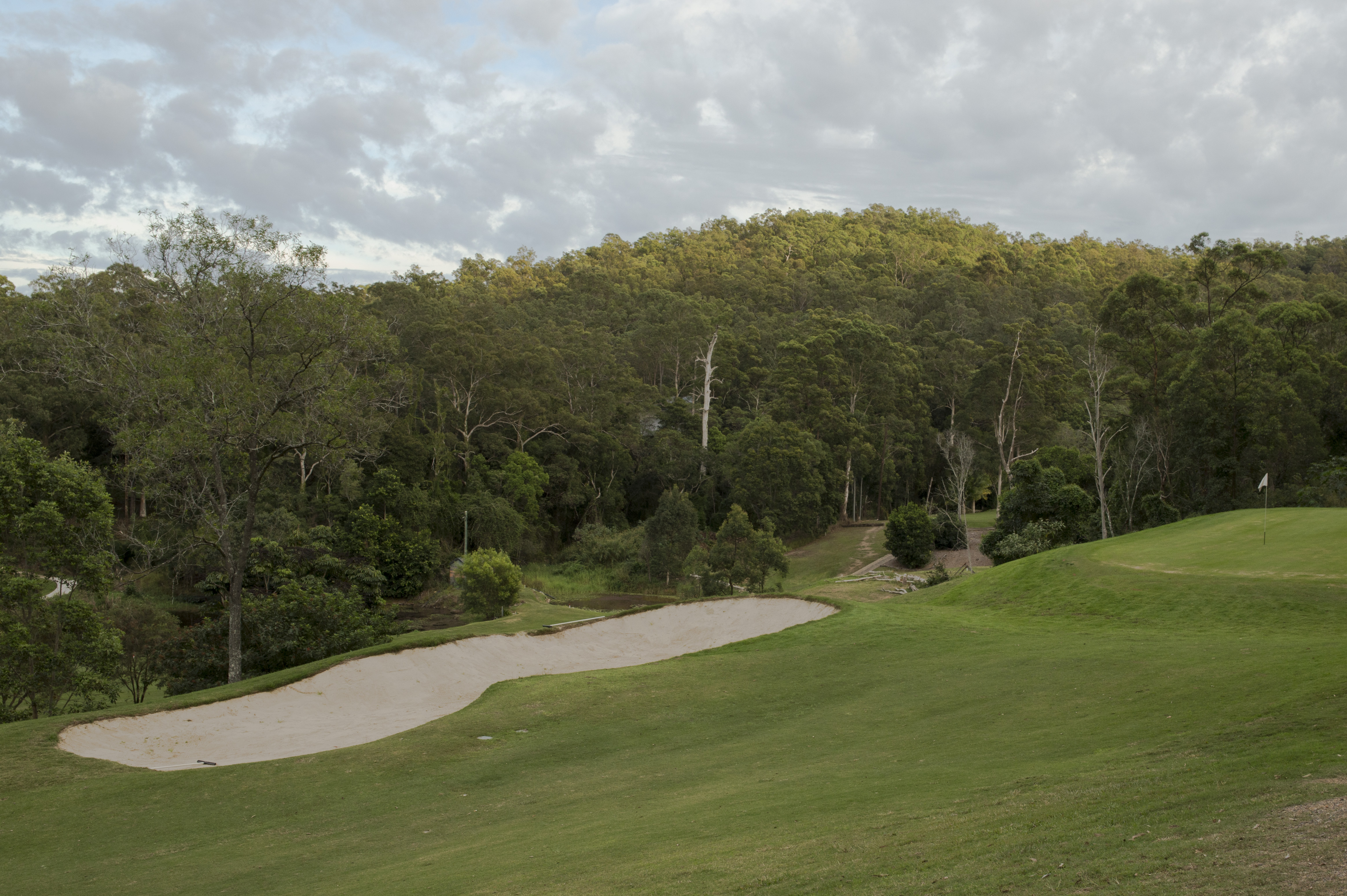
Looking from the tee uphill to the green on the 10th

Ashgrove Golf Club is located in The Gap, Brisbane, Queensland, Australia.

== History ==
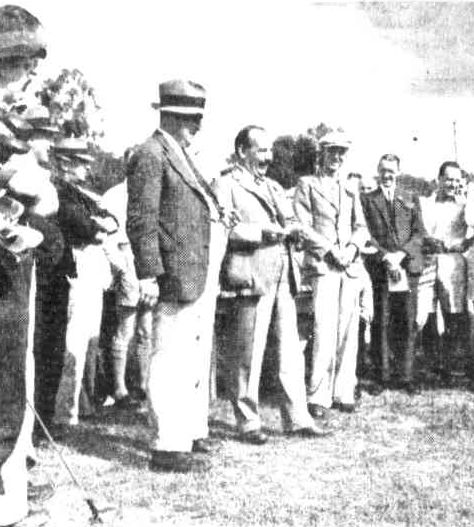
Opening of Ashgove Golf Club, 22 April 1939. Club president, Bruce Shearer, is giving a speech. Queensland Golf Council chairman J. R. O'Keefe is standing to the front at the left.

The club was established in The Gap, Queensland in 1939 using land that was leased from Mark Winstone. The land was originally a dairy farm and market garden. The initial establishment of the course was frustrated by flooding which destroyed two of the three bridges.

The official opening was on Saturday 22 April 1939 by the chairman of the Queensland Golf Council, Mr J. R. O'Keefe. At that time, the course comprised nine holes, ranging in length from 126 yards (115 m) at the 6th hole to 420 yards (380 m) at the 7th hole.

Over time the course was extended to 18 holes.

The course was extensively damaged during major flood events in 1974 and during the 2000–14 period. Governments grants provided some financial assistance to return the course to full playing capability. In the later part of 2014 the Queensland Government provided a grant to restore a section of Enoggera Creek that flows through the course. This work was completed in October 2014.

== The course ==
The layout is challenging for both members and professionals. The club has hosted events on the Sunshine Tour and the trainee program.

== See also ==
- Golf in Australia
