= Western Freeway, Brisbane =

Freeway in Brisbane, Queensland, Australia

Coordinates: 27°29′17.19″S 152°57′59.27″E

Western Freeway Queensland
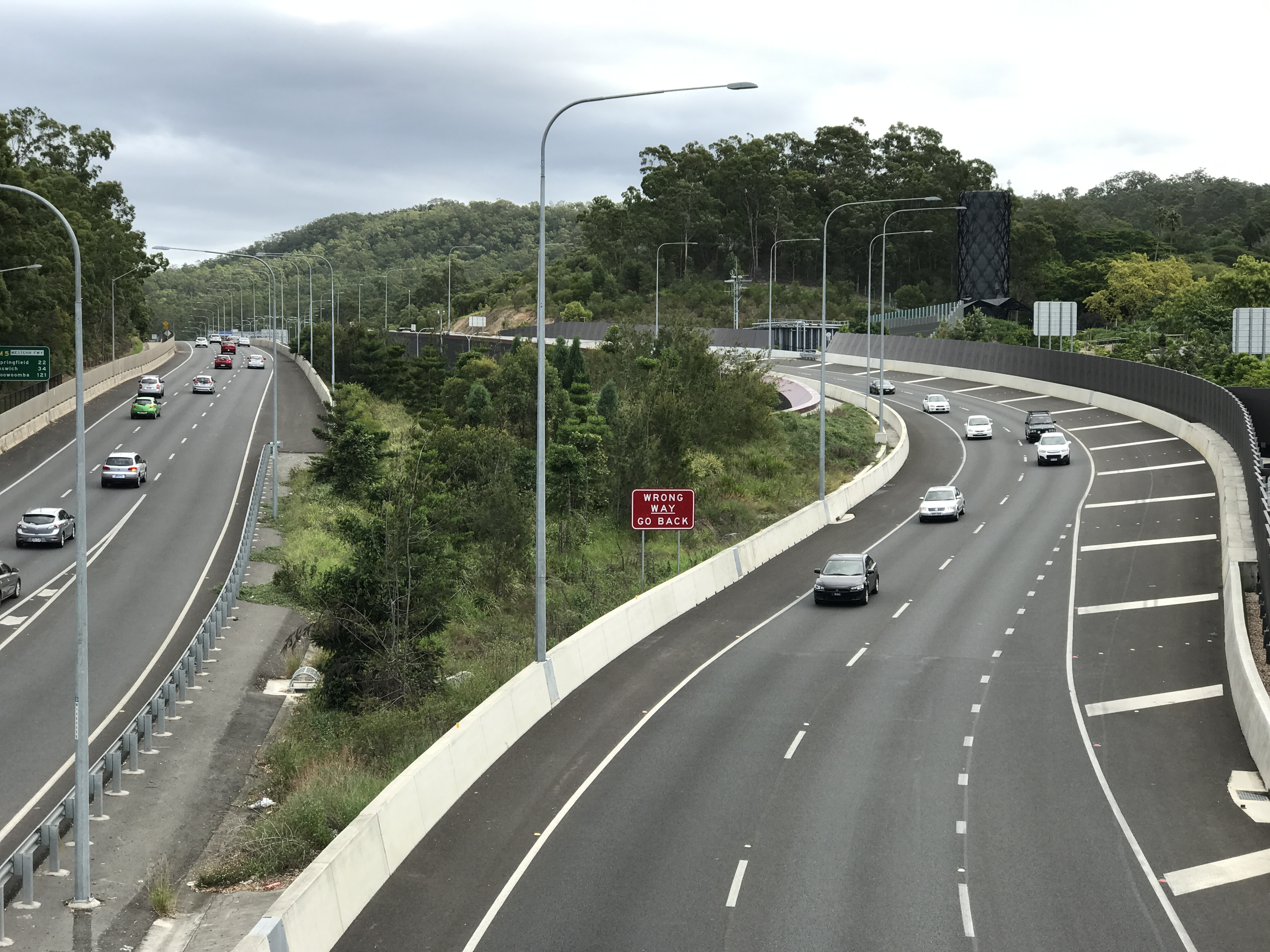
- M5 Western Freeway at Toowong, 2017

General information
- Type: Freeway
- Length: 5 km (3.1 mi)
- Route number(s): M5

Major junctions
- NE end: Mount Coot-tha Road, Toowong, Brisbane
- SW end: Centenary Motorway; Indooroopilly, Brisbane

Highway system
- Highways in Australia; National Highway • Freeways in Australia; Highways in Queensland

The Western Freeway is a 5-kilometre-long (3.1 mi) freeway in western Brisbane that runs from Milton Road in Toowong to the western side of Indooroopilly where the freeway becomes the M5 Centenary Motorway. The freeway bears the symbol and forms part of Metroad 5. There is one interchange, at Indooroopilly onto Moggill Road. A bicycle path runs the length of the freeway, allowing commuting to Toowong and onto Brisbane by bicycle.

== History ==
The Western Freeway was constructed in three sections. The first section was a single carriageway that stretched from Mount Coot-tha Road to Taringa Parade, which opened to traffic on 31 August 1970, and was allocated State Route 32. The second section was also a single carriageway that stretched from Taringa Parade to Moggill Road, which opened to traffic on 24 May 1979. The third and final section from Moggill Road to the Centenary Highway was opened to traffic on 19 December 1984. This section was constructed as a dual carriageway, and as part of the project, the first two sections were also duplicated.

In 2008–2009, the Toowong Bicycle and Pedestrian Overpass was constructed across the Toowong end of the freeway to connect the Western Freeway Cycleway (which runs parallel and east of the freeway) to Mt Coot-tha Road. The fifteen span composite bridge cost $5.4 million.

Work began in April 2011 on the Legacy Way, a tunnel to link the Toowong end of the Western Freeway with the Inner City Bypass at Kelvin Grove to reduce travel time between the Centenary Bridge and the Inner City Bypass by 70%.

In February 2014, work began on widening of Western Freeway (executed as part of Legacy Way tunnel project). The existing four lanes of freeway between western approach ramp of Legacy Way and Moggill Road interchange were upgraded to six lanes. The upgrade was intended to improve traffic flow on the freeway between Moggill Road and Legacy Way tunnel.

As a result of a citizens e-petition, on 9 October 2019, the overpass across the Western Freeway adjacent to the Toowong Cemetery (formerly known as the Toowong Bicycle and Pedestrian Overpass) was renamed the Canon Garland Overpass in honour of David Garland who pioneered Anzac Day ceremonies at the cemetery. The renaming occurred on the 80th anniversary of Garland's death.

== Exits and interchanges ==
The entire freeway is in the City of Brisbane local government area.

Location	km	mi	Destinations	Notes
Toowong	0	0.0	Frederick Street (Metroad 5) north / Milton Road (State Route 32) east / Miskin Street south – Everton Park, Brisbane, Toowong	Northern terminus at roundabout
Toowong	0.4	0.25	Mount Coot-tha Road (Tourist Drive 7) – Mount Coot-tha	Roundabout; route transition: southern terminus of Metroad 5, northern terminus of M5 (motorway-standard)
Toowong	1.4	0.87	Legacy Way (State Route M5) – Kelvin Grove	No entry or exit southbound
Indooroopilly	4.0	2.5	Moggill Road (State Route 33) – Indooroopilly, Kenmore	No exit northbound
Indooroopilly	5.1	3.2	Centenary Motorway (M5) / Moggill Road (State Route 33) – Ipswich, Toowoomba, Indooroopilly, Kenmore	Southern terminus: continues as Centenary Motorway; northbound exit only to Moggill Road
1.000 mi = 1.609 km; 1.000 km = 0.621 mi: Incomplete access; Route transition

== See also ==
- Freeways in Australia
- Freeways in Brisbane
