= Slab Hut Farm =

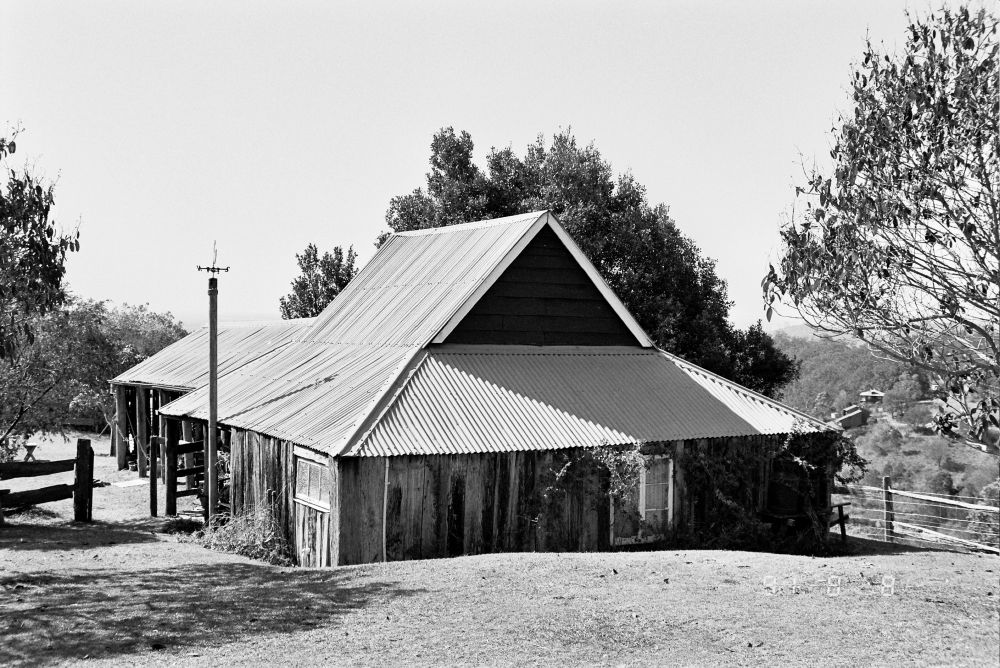
- Slab Hut Farm, 1991

- Location within Queensland Location within Australia
- 27.427°S 152.8776°E
- Location: 847 Mt Nebo Road, Enoggera Reservoir, City of Brisbane, Queensland, Australia

History
- Design period: 1870s - 1890s (late 19th century)
- Built: 1890s - 1890s

Queensland Heritage Register
- Official name: Slab Hut Farm
- Type: state heritage (built)
- Designated: 21 October 1992
- Reference no.: 600329
- Significant period: 1890s (fabric)
- Significant components: shed - livestock, farmhouse, shed - milking, dairy/creamery

Slab Hut Farm is a heritage-listed farm at 847 Mt Nebo Road, Enoggera Reservoir, City of Brisbane, Queensland, Australia. It was built from 1890s to 1890s. It was added to the Queensland Heritage Register on 21 October 1992.

== History ==
The present slab structures mostly date from the 1890s, but the site was occupied from the 1870s.

In 1873 English immigrant George Powers Remfry selected 80 acres (32 hectares) of farmland at Mount Nebo (portion 844, parish of Enoggera). An 1873 survey plan shows a two-roomed store already on the site, erected close to the main road. This store probably serviced timbergetters and goldminers who were working the Enoggera area in the 1860s and 1870s.

By January 1877 Remfry had erected a four-roomed house and outbuildings and had 8 acres (3.2 hectares) cleared and cultivated. Shortly after he was granted a deed to portion 844.

In 1875 Remfry also selected neighbouring portion 863, which comprised 61.5 acres (24.6 hectares). Together with portion 844, he owned over 140 acres (52 hectares) of mostly uncleared land. In 1879 he raised a mortgage of £100 on the property, but was declared insolvent in 1880 and portion 844 was forfeited. He retained portion 863 until 1890.

Thomas McAfee of Samford appears to have leased portion 844 from the mid-1890s at least, and purchased portion 863 in 1897, although he may have been renting the site previously.

The McAfees developed both portions as a dairy farm, and it was during their occupancy that the present buildings were constructed, erected by owner labour and making use of local hardwood and stone.

Reputedly, McAfee built the three-roomed slab house as the family's first dwelling. Whether there is any connection between the early store of the survey plan (by 1873), Remfry's four-roomed house (by early 1877) and the extant three-roomed slab house (mid-1890s) is not clear. There appears to be no trace of the remains of Remfry's house and outbuildings, unless the McAfees recycled the materials in their buildings.

Around 1910 a second dwelling house was erected, the prefabricated timber building which still functions as the main residence.

In 1931 McAfee's widow purchased portion 844, and the property was maintained as a dairy farm until sold in 1959. The site was subdivided in the 1960s into 5 acre (2 hectare) lots.

For nearly six decades the McAfees were well known in the Mt Nebo community, and their name has been perpetuated in the lookout opposite the present entrance to Slab Hut Farm.

There are few comparable slab structures remaining in the Brisbane area. The only other known, extant slab house remaining on its original site was at Magnolia Farm (1890s) at Sunnybank, which was destroyed by fire early in 1999.

== Description ==
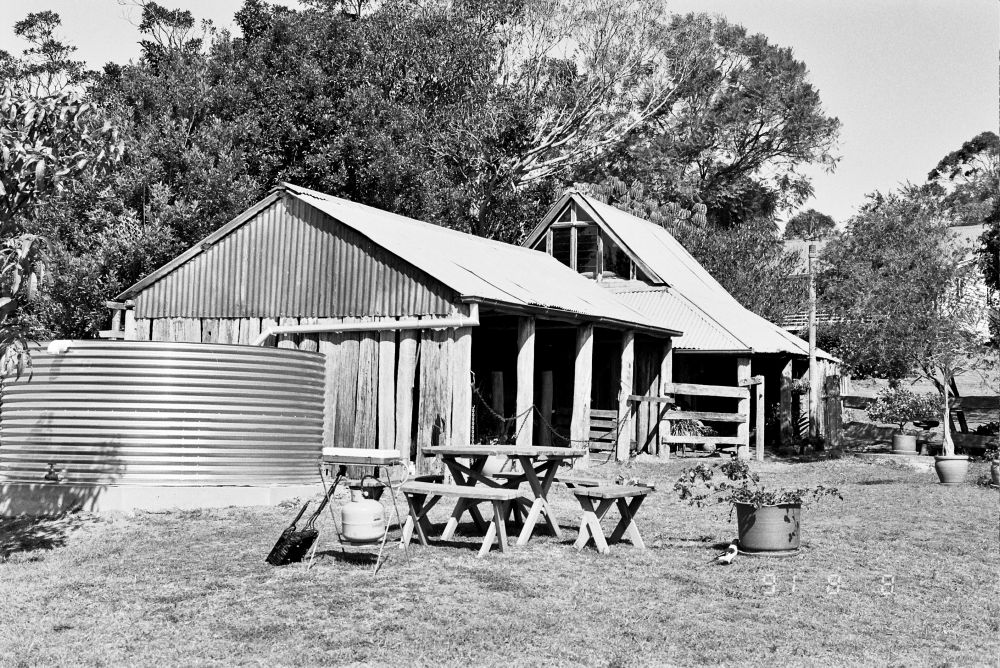
Slab Hut Farm, 1991

Slab Hut Farm occupies a 5-acre (2 hectare) site at Peewee Bend on Mt Nebo Road. The non-urban zoned property is adjacent to the State Forest near the boundary of Brisbane City and City of Moreton Bay (formerly Pine Rivers Shire), in what has become a rural commuter suburb. Although the land has been cleared, several mature fig trees remain.

The various buildings and structures associated with the early development of the property as a dairy farm are grouped in close proximity, clustered along a ridge to take advantage of the natural drainage. These comprise:

=== Slab House ===
This is a low-set, single-storeyed, timber-framed structure with hardwood slab walls and floors and a hipped roof of unlined corrugated iron. Adzed timber rafters and tie beams with few battens support this roof, and the galvanised iron guttering is of early half-round profile. The principal uprights are morticed and tenoned to a bottom plate and carry a top plate, and the whole rests on timber stumps. Split hardwood slabs, both vertical and horizontal, provide the infill between the frames. There are no internal doorways. Slab partitions to ceiling height divide the structure into three rooms, each of which opens onto a verandah which runs the length of the building on the southwest side. The outer edge of the verandah floor is carried by a ground log. The former kitchen features a cooking alcove and chimney of corrugated iron attached to the end wall. This alcove is clad externally with vertical slabs and has a stone floor. Beyond the kitchen a small iron-roofed lean-to supported by timber posts is attached to the rear of the fireplace. The building remains substantially intact and has been furnished as a private museum, illustrating a typical bedroom and kitchen of the pioneer era.

=== Creamery ===
Although similar in structure to the early dwelling, the slab walls of the creamery are horizontal and the light-framed, steeply pitched gabled roof is continued as a shallower pitched hipped roof on all sides to form verandahs. This roof was shingled originally, but is clad now with unlined corrugated iron. The outer edges are supported by timber posts and one of the gabled ends retains its original slab infill. The creamery has been modified sympathetically to provide residential accommodation. This has involved enclosing sections of the verandahs with vertical slabs, glazing of the eastern gable end, some brick walling, and setting in of windows. Concrete covers the original earth floor.

=== Dairy ===
Adjoining the creamery is the dairy, a simple rectangular building of slab construction which is open on one side. The frame consists of large timber posts set into the ground with a top plate to support the roof, which was shingled originally. The current roof has a frame of milled timber, with corrugated iron cladding and modern guttering. Vertical slabs attached to top and bottom plates provide the infill along three sides. Internally the dairy retains the posts and rails which form the milking stalls, and at the eastern end there is a sapling storage shelf at ceiling level.

=== Calf Shed ===
Beyond the dairy stands the calf shed, a small structure of four posts with slab walls on three sides and open along one length. It has a corrugated iron gabled roof and slab gable infill. The long side enclosing wall has been shifted from the north to the south of the structure using the old nails.

=== Farmhouse ===
The dwelling house is a one-storeyed prefabricated structure of milled timber with a gabled corrugated iron roof. The front is single-skin chamferboard with exposed cross-bracing; the remaining sides are clad in weatherboards and lined with tongue and groove v-joints. Although the farmhouse has been altered with extensions to each end, picture-windows in the rear wall and an additional verandah beyond this, the cottage atmosphere has been retained.

== Heritage listing ==
Slab Hut Farm was listed on the Queensland Heritage Register on 21 October 1992 having satisfied the following criteria.

The place is important in demonstrating the evolution or pattern of Queensland's history.

Slab Hut Farm at Mt Nebo, established in the 1890s, is significant historically for its association with the early opening of Mt Nebo to timbergetters and goldminers, and with the development of the area as a farming district in the late 19th century.

The place demonstrates rare, uncommon or endangered aspects of Queensland's cultural heritage.

It is a rare Brisbane survivor of the pioneer era, rarer still for the site integrity and intactness of the buildings and structures, which provide unique evidence of the working of a late 19th century Queensland dairy farm.

The place is important in demonstrating the principal characteristics of a particular class of cultural places.

They also provide rare surviving evidence of pioneer house construction techniques and materials, and of bush lifestyle.

The place is important because of its aesthetic significance.

Slab Hut Farm has a strong aesthetic appeal, engendered by the rustic setting and materials.

The place has a special association with the life or work of a particular person, group or organisation of importance in Queensland's history.

The place is significant for its local association with the McAfee family.
