= Enoggera (wasp) =

Scientific classification
- Kingdom: Animalia
- Phylum: Arthropoda
- Class: Insecta
- Order: Hymenoptera
- Family: Pteromalidae
- Genus: Enoggera; Girault, 1926

Genus of wasps

Enoggera is a genus of wasp in the Pteromalidae family. It is native to Australia and has five known species. It was introduced to South Africa to serve as biological pest-control against the Eucalyptus destroying beetle, Trachymela tincticollis.

== Taxonomy ==
Enoggera contains the following species:

- Enoggera nassaui
- Enoggera reticulata
