= The Gap State High School =

Location
- The Gap, Brisbane, Queensland; Australia; 27°26′45.4″S 152°56′58.74″E

Information
- Type: State secondary high school
- Motto: Ours The Future
- Established: July 1959
- Principal: Anne McLauchlan
- Enrolment: 1,692 (2023)
- Campus: Suburban
- Colours: Green, grey and white
- Website: thegapshs.eq.edu.au

The Gap State High School is located in the suburb of The Gap in Brisbane, Queensland, Australia, with a student population of 1,692 in 2024. The Gap State High School is an Education Queensland Secondary High School.

== History ==
The Gap State High School was opened on 25 January 1960.

In 2009, the school gained the attention of the media following the suspected stabbing of a student.

In early 2018, the school gained media attention as a number of students were given detention for wearing footwear that did not comply with the strict uniform guidelines.

In 2023 a deadly eastern brown snake was spotted in the school grounds resulting in a whole school lockdown.

On October 30, 2024 the industrial block was destroyed by a fire due to a laser being left on. As a result, the school was evacuated and on-site activities were cancelled.

== Campus ==
The Gap State High School's Leadership Training Centre opened in August 2002 and features 22 adventure courses including indoor rock climbing and bouldering walls used to develop leadership and communication skills as part of the Applied Positive Psychology program, which is compulsory for all students to promote good mental health and lower the chances of student suicide. The Leadership Training Centre is open to other schools and the community, and has been used by professional athletes and by the Australian Army for cadet training. The original teachers working at the centre were trained by a past student of the Gap State High School.

The performing arts centre has an auditorium that can house up to 150 students.

Sporting facilities include two cricket nets, two full size soccer fields, four basketball courts, and a sports hall that houses four volleyball/three basketball courts with digital signage for each court controlled by iPads. This sporting facility was opened on 21 February 2014 by Premier Campbell Newman.

== Principals ==
Numerous principals have served the school, including:

- Ronald Petty (1960–1963)
- Tom Brady (1964–1967)
- Jack Robertson (1968–1982)
- Bob Rasmussen (1983–1988)
- Bob Guthrie (1989–1999)
- Regan Neumann (2000–2006)
- Russell Pollock (2006–2017)
- Anne McLauchlan (2017 to present)

== Notable alumni ==
- Arch Bevis — politician
- Nikki Boyd — politician
- Andrew Stockdale — singer, musician, songwriter, and record producer
- Max Belter — alleged terrorist
