= The Gap, Queensland =

The Gap
- Suburb
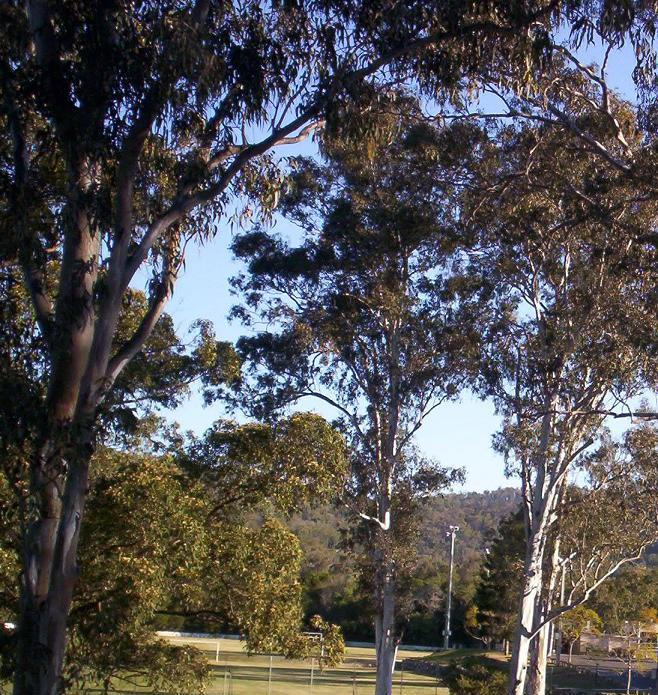
- Walton Bridge Reserve at The Gap

- Interactive map of The Gap
- Coordinates: 27.4416°S 152.9444°E
- Country: Australia
- State: Queensland
- City: Brisbane
- LGA: City of Brisbane (The Gap Ward)
- Location: 10 km (6.2 mi) NW of Brisbane CBD

Government
  - State electorate: Cooper
  - Federal division: Ryan

Area
  - Total: 12.6 km^{2} (4.9 sq mi)

Population
  - Total: 17,318 (2021 census)
  - Density: 1,374/km^{2} (3,560/sq mi)
- Time zone: UTC+10:00 (AEST)
- Postcode: 4061
Suburbs around The Gap
Upper Kedron	Keperra	Enoggera
Enoggera Reservoir	The Gap	Ashgrove
Brookfield	Mount Coot-tha	Bardon

The Gap is a north-western suburb in the City of Brisbane, Queensland, Australia. In the 2021 census, The Gap had a population of 17,318 people.

== Geography ==
The Gap is 10 kilometres (6.2 mi) by road north-west of the Brisbane GPO.

The Gap was named for its geographical location in the valley between Mount Coot-tha and Enoggera Hill (i.e. 'the gap' between hills) which both form part of the Taylor Range.

== History ==
Initially inhabited by the Turrbal people, The Gap was originally heavily forested. With the arrival of European settlement, timber felling became the first industry in the area, and with the removal of the timber the area was turned over to farming. The first crown lease of land was in 1851, to Darby McGrath who ran a sheep station across the entire valley. The first freehold land sale was made in 1858, to P.B. and J. Paten in the area where Paten road runs today. Access to The Gap in the 1850s was via tracks which became Waterworks and Payne Roads. They also provided access to Enoggera Dam which was built in 1866 to provide a water supply for Brisbane.

A timber Primitive Methodist Church opened on Waterworks Road on Sunday 25 May 1873 on land donated by Moses Adsett. A foundation stone for a new brick church was laid on 2 October 1960 by the Reverend Dr Robert William Fulcher. Following the amalgamation of the Methodist Church into the Uniting Church in Australia in 1977, it became present-day The Gap Uniting Church. On 15 September 2001 a new auditorium was dedicated by Reverend Dr Ray Reddicliffe, the Moderator of the Queensland Synod of the Uniting Church in Australia.

From 1879 The Gap was part of the local government area called Ithaca Division, then part of the Shire of Enoggera from 1887 to 1925.

A map advertised the sale of 800 allotments at Royal Park Estate, now The Gap and St. John's Wood Extension Estate, Ashgrove by F. M. Anglim in August 1927.

Gap State School opened on 22 January 1912. It was renamed The Gap State School in the early 1960s.

Following World War I, the area was broken up into smaller farms for returned servicemen, many of whom farmed poultry and dairy cattle. Many of these farms were too small to be commercially successful, however small pockets of farming remained in The Gap until the 1980s.

Mason's jam factory was established about 1939 by Claude Hamilton Mason. It was located to the east of the Ashgrove Golf Course (27.4464°S 152.9641°E), but closed circa 1990.

The Gap State High School opened on 25 January 1960.

Payne Road State School opened on 27 January 1970.

St Peter Chanel Catholic Primary School opened on 29 August 1972.

Hilder Road State School opened on 30 January 1979.

The billabong between The Gap State High School and Payne Road Primary School was a favourite swimming location and over the years has been home to turtles, eels and platypus. It was named Shepherd's Pool, supposedly after a shepherd who was killed by aborigines in 1852, although the name may derive from a P.A. Shepherd, who leased the adjacent land in the 1930s.

There was a toll gate on Waterworks Road near what is now the entrance to Brisbane Forest Park.

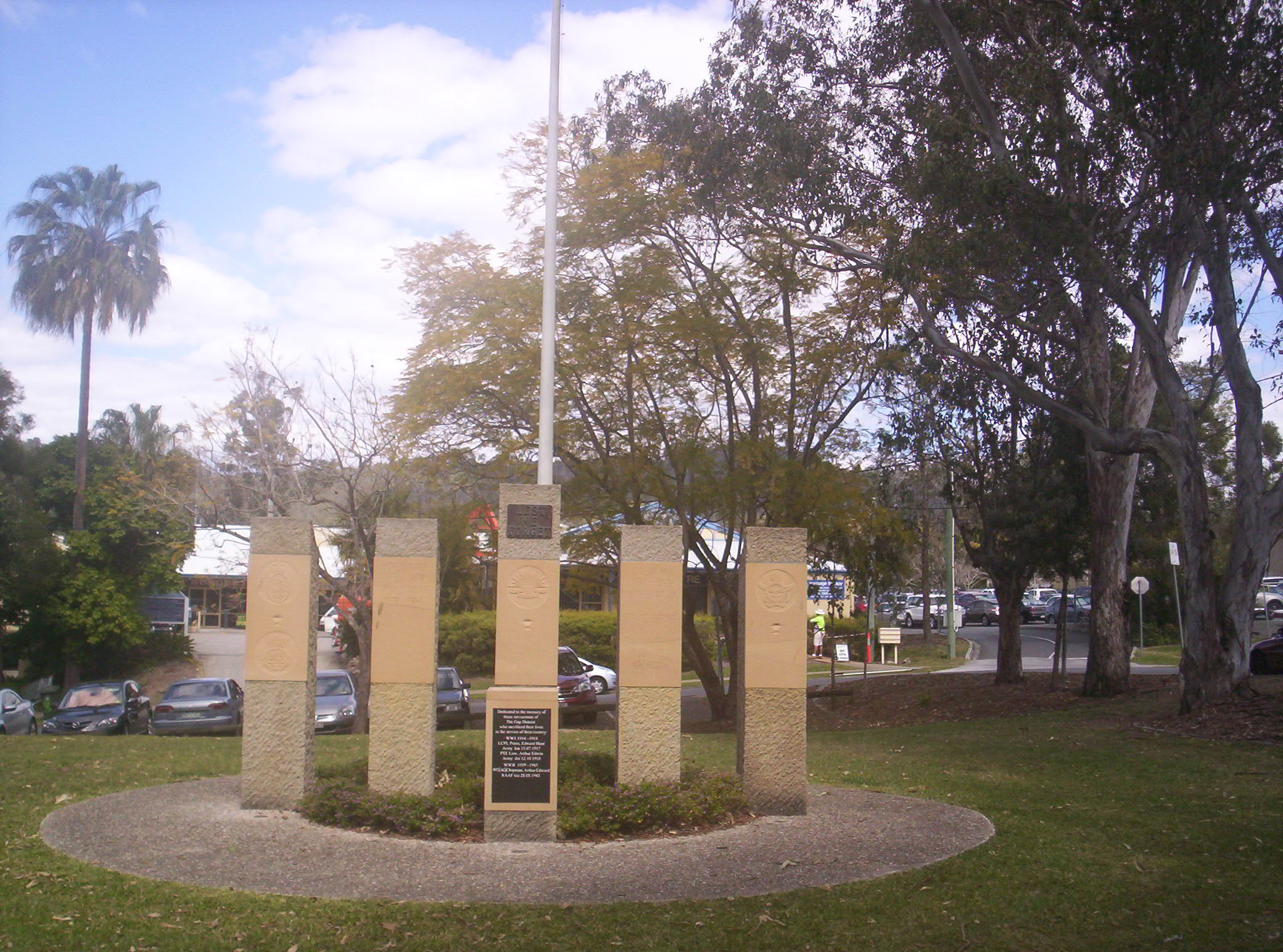
The Gap War Memorial at Walton Bridge Reserve, 2010

The Gap War Memorial is located at Walton Bridge Reserve (27.4464°S 152.9641°E) and commemorates those who served in World War I and World War II.

The Gap was affected by a major storm on the afternoon of 16 November 2008. A microburst hit The Gap with extremely high winds, causing many trees to fall onto homes and major roads, as well as causing many houses to lose their roofs.

== Demographics ==
In the 2016 census, The Gap had a population of 16,692 people.

In the 2021 census, The Gap had a population of 17,318 people.

== Attractions ==
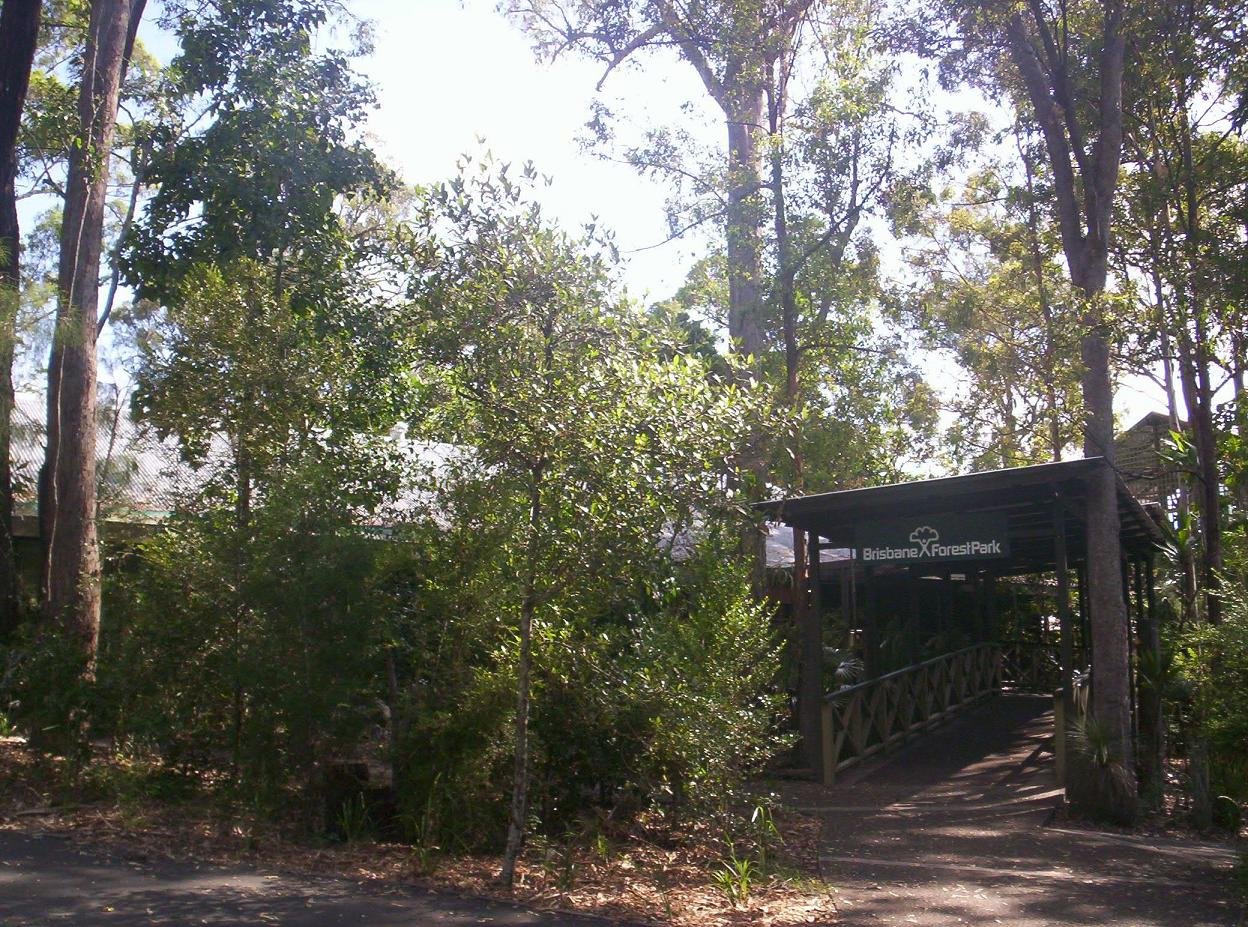
At the entrance to Walkabout Creek

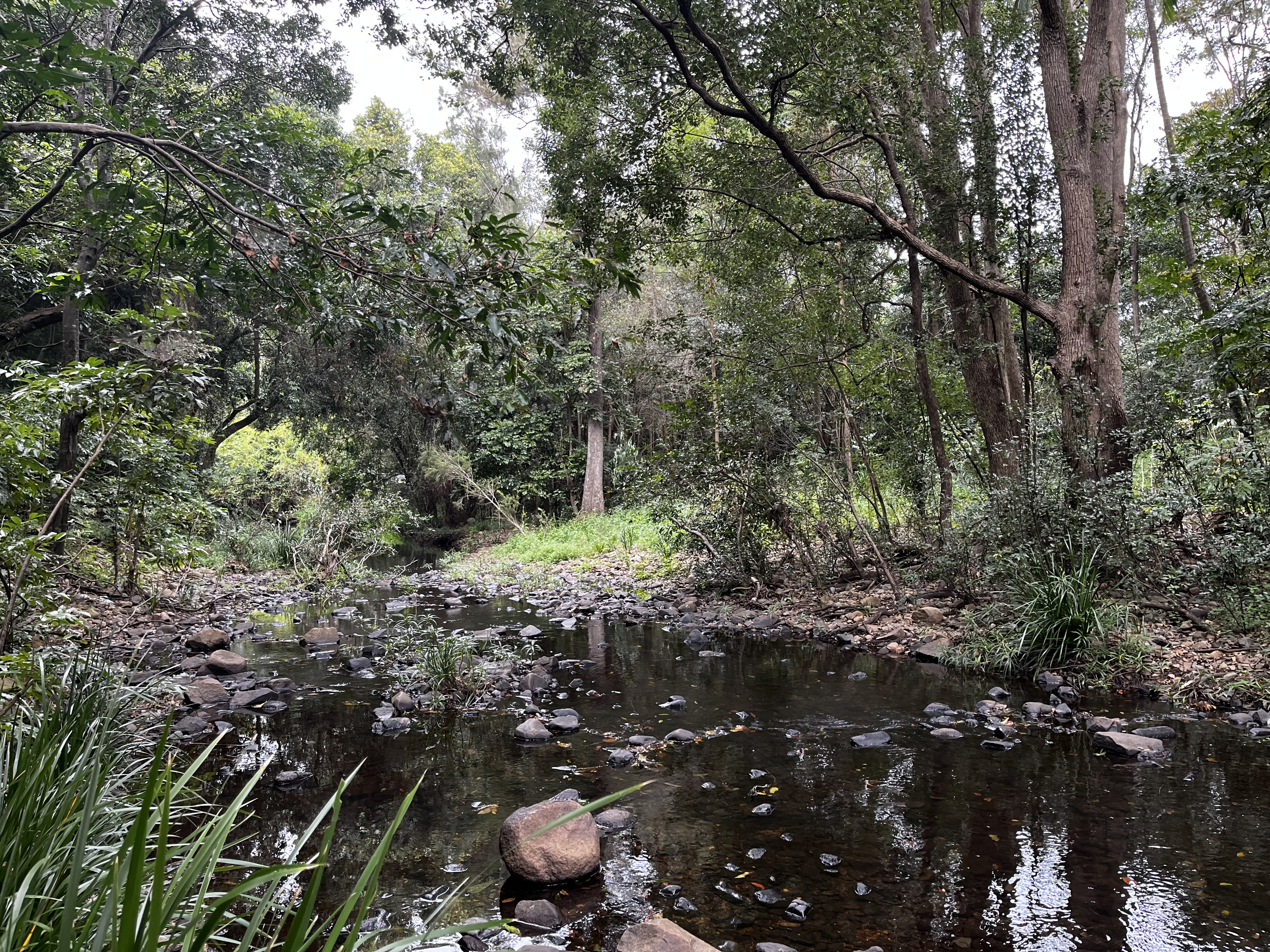
The Enoggera Creek as it runs through Allamanda Street Park in The Gap, Queensland

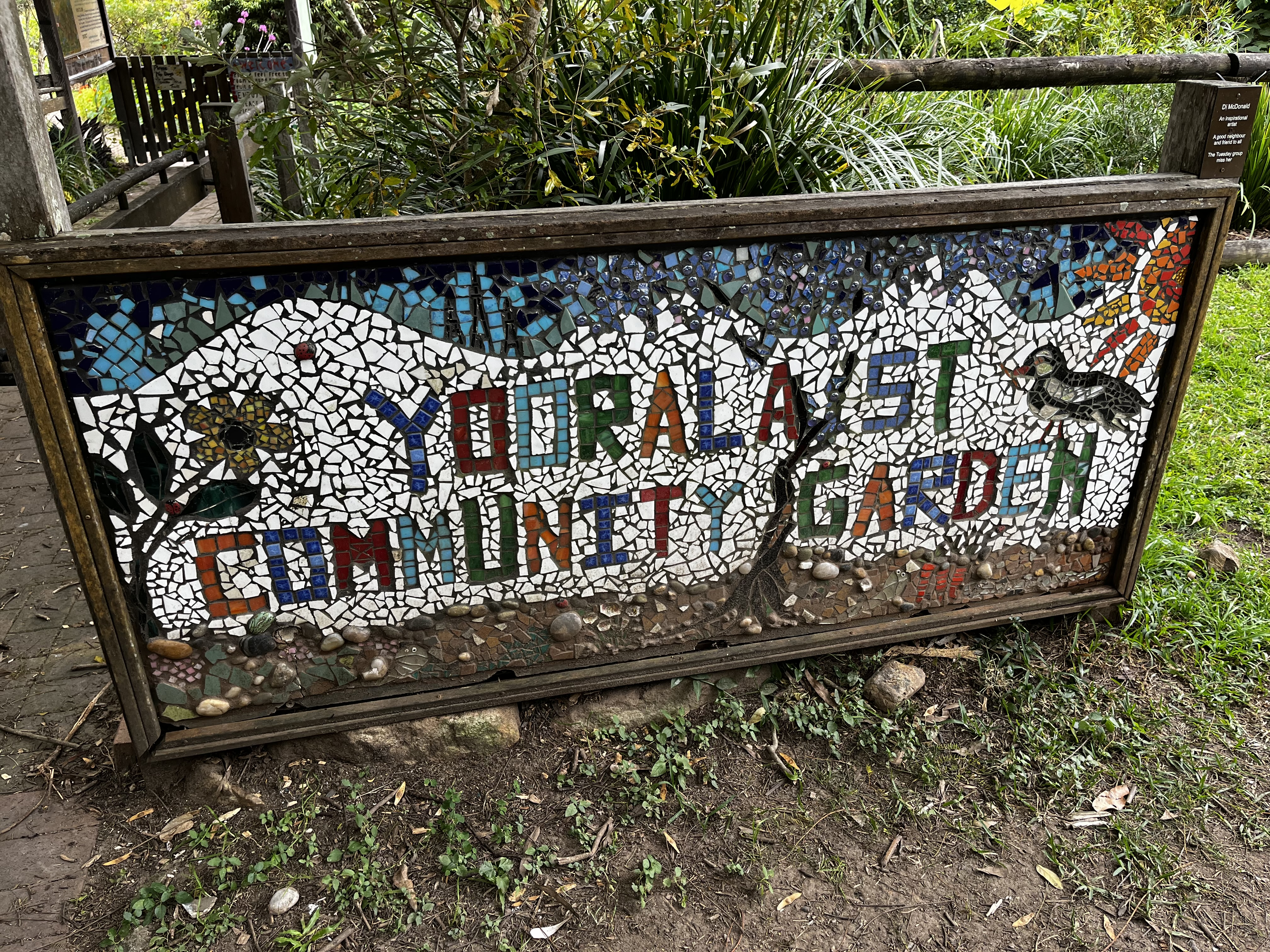
The mosaic entry sign at the Yoorala Street Community Garden

The district was later subdivided into blocks of land for housing estates. The recreational activities of inhabitants of the suburb are well catered for, with many facilities including many sporting clubs (Soccer, Tennis, Athletics, Swimming and Golf etc.). The Gap also contains over 45 lush green parks, many of which include sporting/recreation areas, playgrounds, pathways, barbeques (wood & electric), toilets and dog off-leash areas. Some of these parks are home to scout clubs, community gardens (the Yoorala Street Community Garden) and other clubhouses.

Adjacent to The Gap is Enoggera Reservoir and Walkabout Creek Discovery Centre. The Reservoir is open for some water-based recreation, while it is not currently being used as a drinking water source, including fishing, canoeing/kayaking and stand-up paddling. Facilities include a paddle craft launch point and designated swimming area. Fishing is permitted from the shoreline or from paddle craft. Bushwalking and mountain biking are accessible from the site, with links in to the D’Aguilar Park trail network.

The Gap is also where the main entrance to Walkabout Creek, in what was previously known as Brisbane Forest Park, (now officially the southern part of D'Aguilar National Park), is located. A major bushland area in Brisbane's west, there is an information and wildlife education centre, with many Australian wildlife species, including marsupials, birds, fish and reptiles. For a number of years, now, there has been a resident platypus named Burrun at Walkabout Creek and, more recently, a second platypus named Willum (Burrun's half-brother). Bred at Healesville Sanctuary in Victoria, they are the sons of Barak, the platypus at Lone Pine Koala Sanctuary.

Ashgrove Golf Club is located at 863 Waterworks Road, this club was formed in April 1939 as a nine-hole format. Over time the club expanded to eighteen holes utilising freehold and leased land. The land was originally a dairy farm and market garden. Mark Winston was the original owner who leased the land to the club until the club bought the land in 1950 for £12,000. The club celebrated the 75th anniversary of the formation of the club in April 2014.

== Facilities ==
The suburb has a small shopping village called The Gap Village (which extends from Walton Bridge Reserve to The Gap State High School and Payne Road State School).

There is a local police station in the suburb, at 965 Waterworks Rd.

A Queensland Fire & Rescue station (515 Waterworks Rd, Ashgrove) and a Queensland Ambulance Service station (84 Baileys Rd, Ashgrove), are in close proximity to The Gap.

== Amenities ==
The Gap is served by a fortnightly visit of the Brisbane City Council's mobile library service at the car park in the sports ground at the end of Glenaffric Street.

There are also Christian churches of many denominations, including:

- The Gap Uniting Church, 1050 Waterworks Road (27.4448°S 152.9478°E)
- St Mark's Anglican Church, 1073 Waterworks Road
- The Gap Baptist Church, 1125 Waterworks Road
- St Peter Chanel Catholic Church, 41 Chaprowe Road
- Rivercity Family Church, 59 Settlement Road

== Education ==
The Gap State School is a government primary (Prep–6) school for boys and girls at the corner of Waterworks and Settlement Roads (27.4431°S 152.9446°E). In 2018, the school had an enrolment of 593 students with 44 teachers (36 full-time equivalent) and 31 non-teaching staff (18 full-time equivalent). It includes a special education program.

Payne Road State School is a government primary (Prep–6) school for boys and girls at 171 Payne Road (27.4494°S 152.9514°E). In 2018, the school had an enrolment of 283 students with 24 teachers (18 full-time equivalent) and 18 non-teaching staff (11 full-time equivalent). It includes a special education program.

Hilder Road State School is a government primary (Prep–6) school for boys and girls at Kaloma Road (27.4368°S 152.9372°E). In 2018, the school had an enrolment of 465 students with 42 teachers (35 full-time equivalent) and 20 non-teaching staff (13 full-time equivalent). It includes a special education program.

St Peter Chanel Primary School is a Catholic primary (Prep–6) school for boys and girls at 41 Chaprowe Road (27.4390°S 152.9458°E). In 2018, the school had an enrolment of 404 students with 32 teachers (26 full-time equivalent) and 19 non-teaching staff (8 full-time equivalent).

The Gap State High School is a government secondary (7–12) school for boys and girls at 1020 Waterworks Road (27.4450°S 152.9504°E). In 2018, the school had an enrolment of 1456 students with 117 teachers (109 full-time equivalent) and 50 non-teaching staff (42 full-time equivalent). It includes a special education program.

== Transport ==
Travel to, and within, The Gap is by road. As well as private vehicles, The Gap has a good public bus service. The main arterial road through The Gap is Waterworks Road, which heads east through the suburbs St Johns Wood, Ashgrove and Red Hill and then, as Musgrave Road, it continues to Brisbane city. Waterworks Road was widened, from two lanes to four lanes, along the 8 kilometres (5.0 mi) stretch of road between The Gap and Red Hill between July 1999 and December 2003. Total cost was A$50 million.

== Popular culture ==
In 2009, scenes for the feature film Jucy (2010) were shot in the suburb.

Robert Forster (musician), one of the founding members of the musical group, The Go-Betweens, grew up in The Gap and wrote about the suburb in his 2016 memoir, Grant & I.

David Malouf's novel Johnno references The Gap on two occasions, as does the debut novel of journalist Trent Dalton, Boy Swallows Universe.

Many of the scenes in the ABC children's show Bluey are inspired by the creator's experiences living in The Gap.

== Photos of The Gap ==
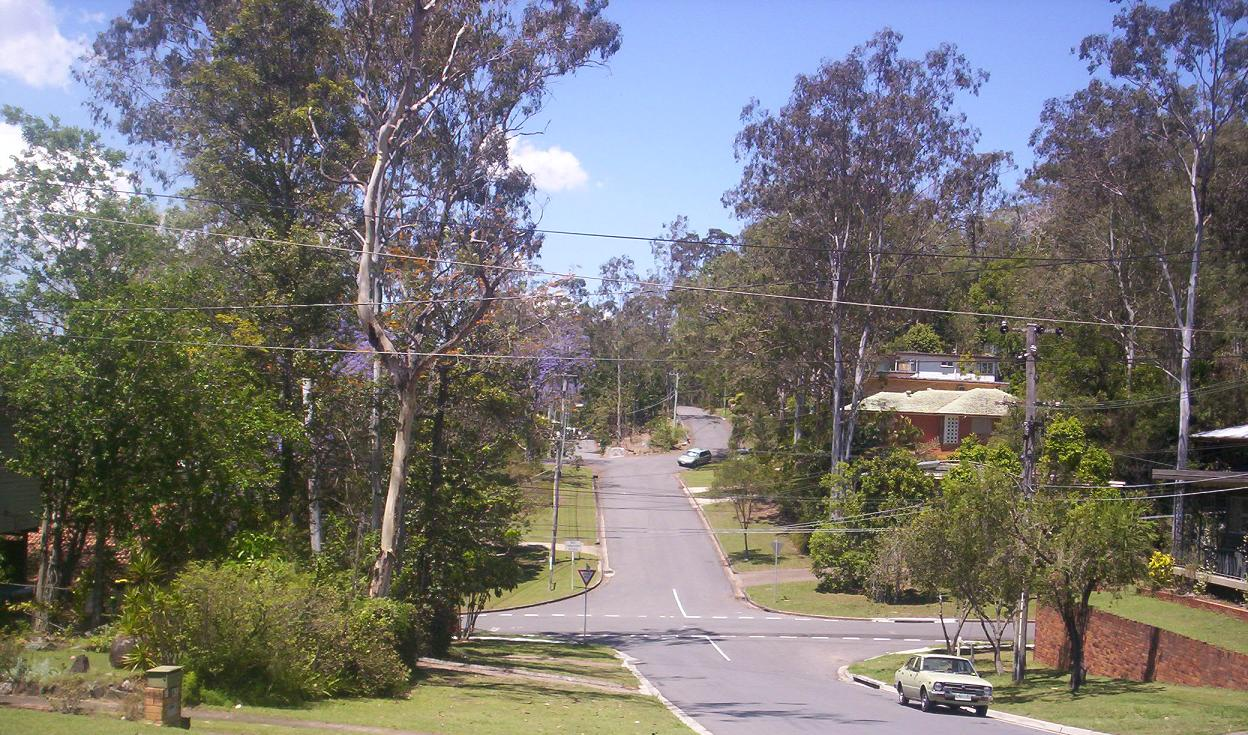
A street in The Gap

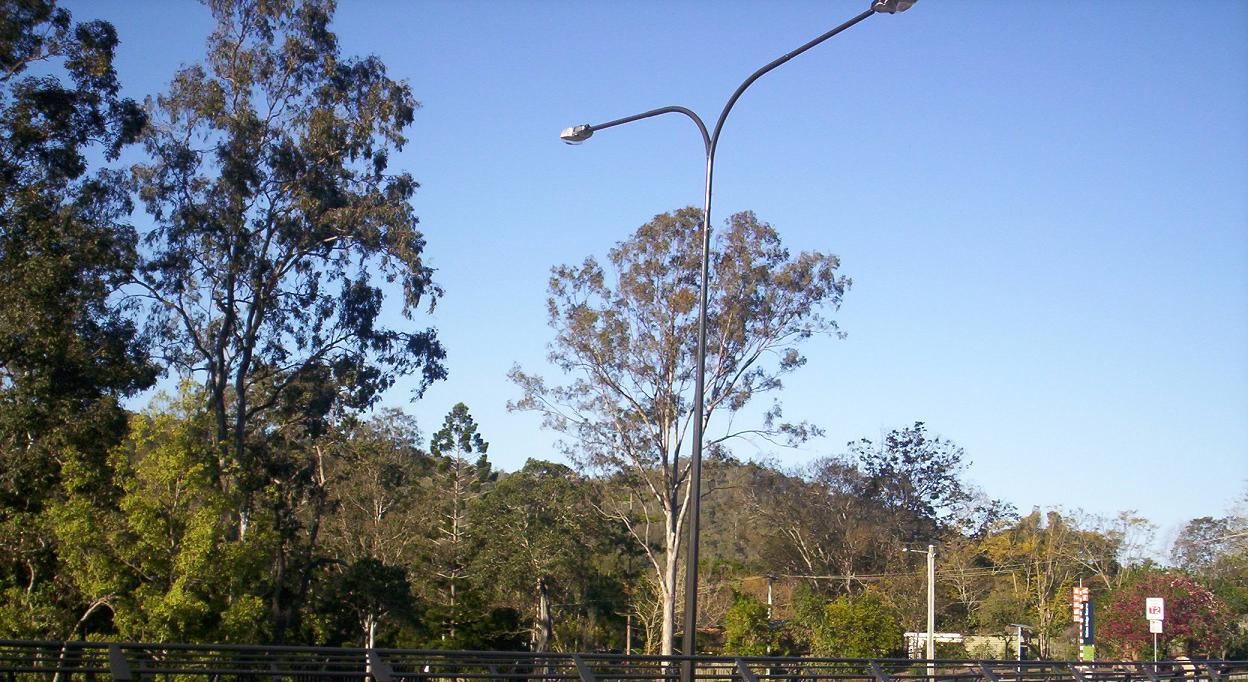
Enoggera Hill at The Gap

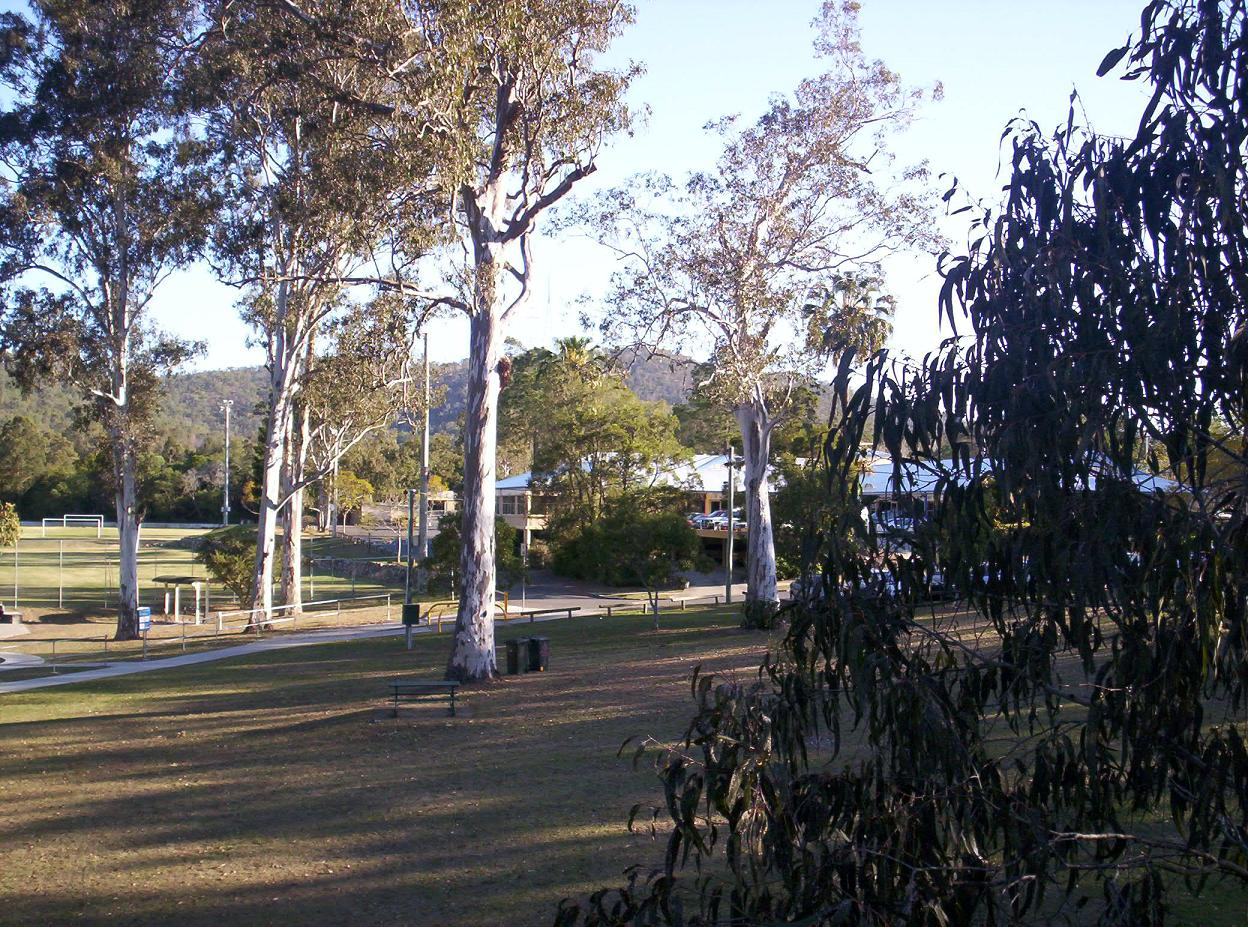
Walton Bridge Reserve at The Gap

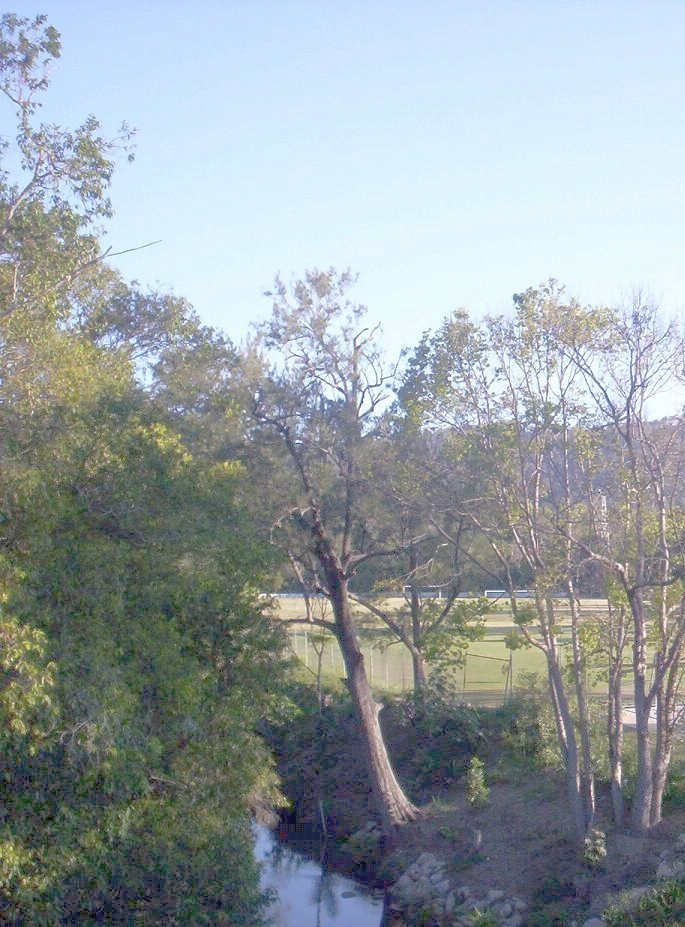
Walton Bridge Reserve at The Gap

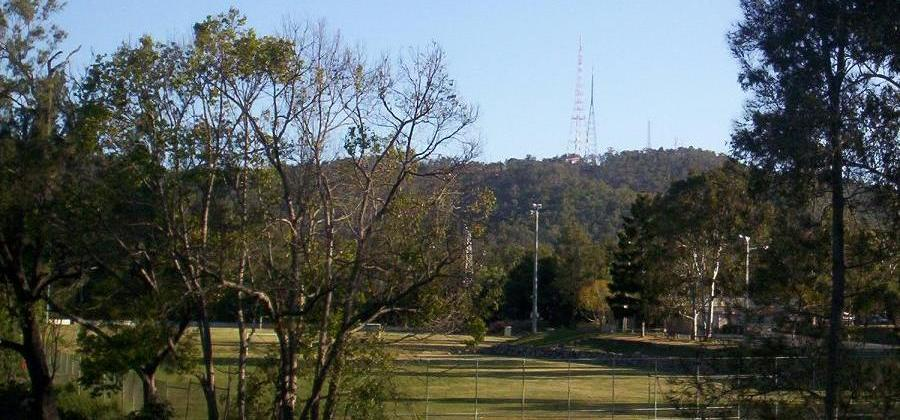
Mount Coot-tha and the Television Towers, and Walton Bridge Reserve
