= Enoggera Hill =

Hill in Enoggera, Queensland, Australia

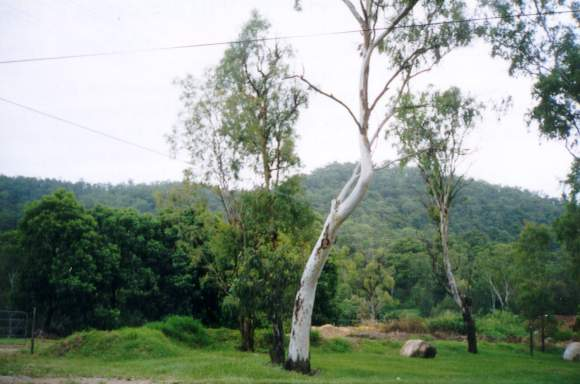
Enoggera Hill

Enoggera Hill is a mountain of the Taylor Range in suburb of Enoggera, City of Brisbane, Queensland, Australia (27.4289°S 152.95934°E). Its peak is 284 metres (932 ft) above sea level.

== Geography ==
The hill is located within the Enoggera Close Training Area of the Gallipoli Barracks.

Enoggera Hill is close to Mount Coot-tha and like this peak, it is mostly covered by bushland. The hill is located within the grounds.

A communications tower sits on the top of Enoggera Hill.

== See also ==
- Enoggera
