= Enoggera Creek =

Creek in Queensland, Australia

Enoggera
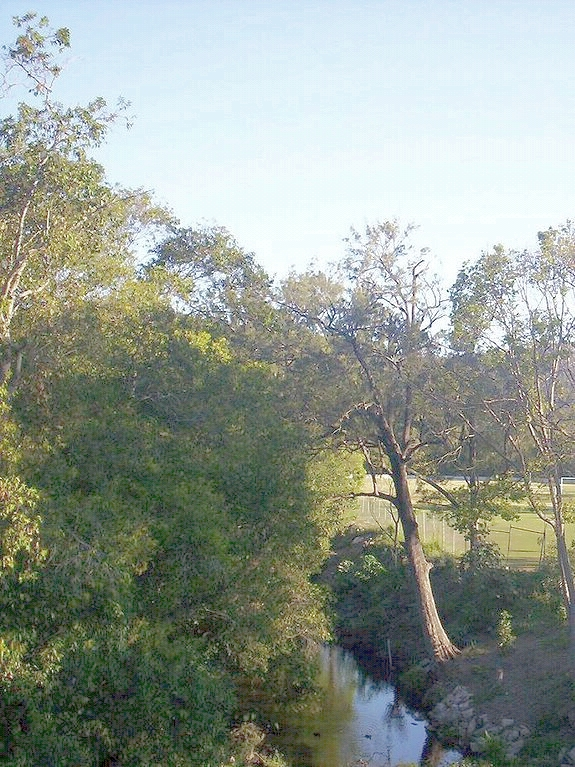
- Enoggera Creek at The Gap, 2010

Location
- Country: Australia
- State: Queensland
- Region: South East Queensland
- City: Brisbane

Physical characteristics
- Source: Mount Nebo
  - location: D'Aguilar Range
  - coordinates: 27.4017°S 152.8059°E
- Mouth: Breakfast Creek
  - location: railway bridge at the intersection of the suburbs of Windsor, Albion and Bowen Hills
  - coordinates: 27.4336°S 153.0397°E

Basin features
- Tributaries
  - left: Fish Creek
  - right: Ithaca Creek

Enoggera Creek is a creek which flows through the City of Brisbane in South-East Queensland, Australia. Enoggera Creek has two main tributaries named Fish Creek and Ithaca Creek. The name of Enoggera Creek changes to Breakfast Creek two kilometres prior to entering the Brisbane River.

== Geography ==
Enoggera Creek's headwaters form on the southern slopes of Mount Nebo in the D'Aguilar National Park.

The creek flows through the D'Aguilar National Park into a reservoir formed by Enoggera Dam (27.4473°S 152.927°E) in the suburb of Enoggera Reservoir. After leaving the D'Aguilar National Park at the dam wall, the creek meanders in a south-easterly direction. It flows through the Brisbane suburbs of The Gap and Ashgrove where it separates the neighbourhood of St Johns Wood from the rest of the suburb. It then flows through Alderley, Newmarket, Red Hill, Kelvin Grove, Wilston, Herston, Windsor and Bowen Hills.

The name of the creek changes to Breakfast Creek where it flows under the railway bridge at the intersection of the suburbs of Windsor, Bowen Hills and Albion. Breakfast Creek then flows into the Brisbane River next to the site of Newstead House, Brisbane's oldest surviving residence.

Fish Creek is entirely in the suburb of The Gap. Fed by a spring, the creek begins on private property north-west of Wittonga Park flowing through that park to join Enoggera Creek at Walton Bridge Reserve. Named for the large number and types of fish found there, Fish Creek still supports a good numbers of native fish including Crimson-spotted rainbow fish Melanotaenia duboulayi.

Ithaca Creek flows from Mount Coot-tha and joins Enoggera Creek from the south at the intersection of the suburbs of Ashgrove, Red Hill and Newmarket (27.4453°S 153.0019°E).

Enoggera Creek is being rehabilitated by the community organisation called Save Our Waterways Now (SOWN). In 2022-23 SOWN conducted a survey of vegetation on Enoggera Creek between Enoggera Reservoir and Walton Bridge Reserve. The Gap Rainforest Statement of Significance concluded the area supported critically endangered Lowland Rainforest of Subtropical Australia including numerous large trees estimated to predate British colonisation of Australia. In 2026 SOWN listed 43 local bushcare groups working to restore sites along Enoggera Creek and its tributaries.

== History ==
Breakfast Creek was named in 1824 by surveyor John Oxley who had camped at the mouth of the creek on the Brisbane River bank. The name commemorates an incident with Aboriginal people at breakfast time. The name Euoggeru Creek was recorded on a surveyor's map in 1855. Euoggeru was the name of an important Aboriginal meeting place by the creek. Euoggeru means corroboree. The place name later changed to Enoggera due to a bureaucratic error. Both names were retained for the creek due to their historical importance.

Significant flooding has occurred along the creek during major floods including 1893 and 1974 Brisbane flood resulting in a number of houses being washed away. The Gap Storm on 16 November 2008 brought down thousands of trees and caused significant property damage. Flooding also occurred on Enoggera Creek in 2009 and 2011.

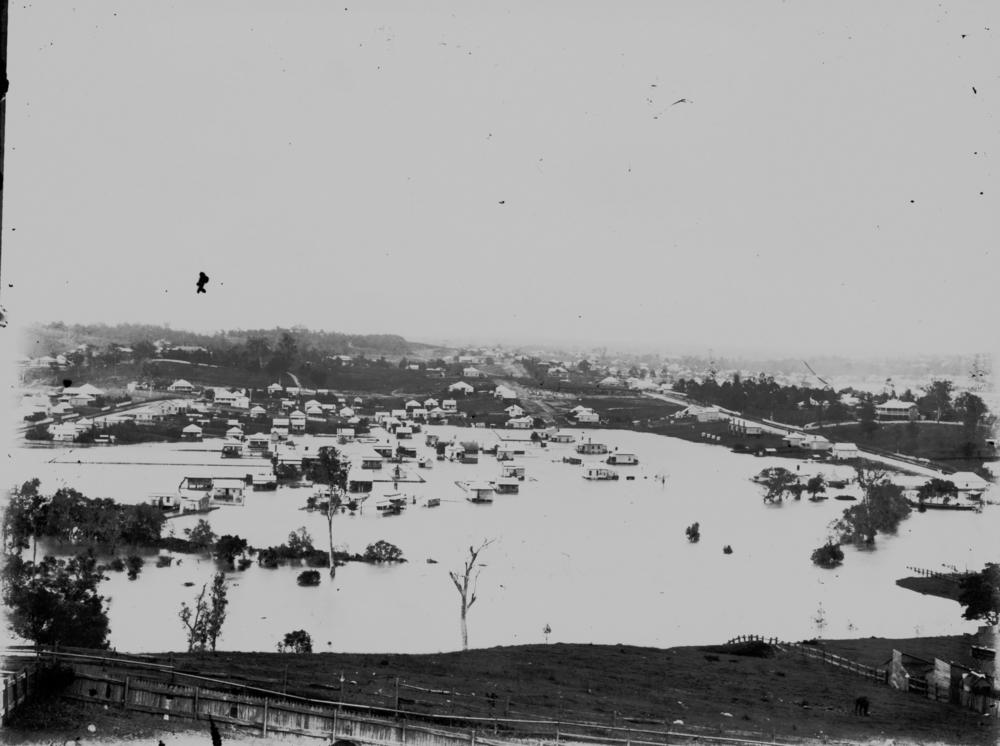
Flooding around Enoggera Creek, Windsor, 1893

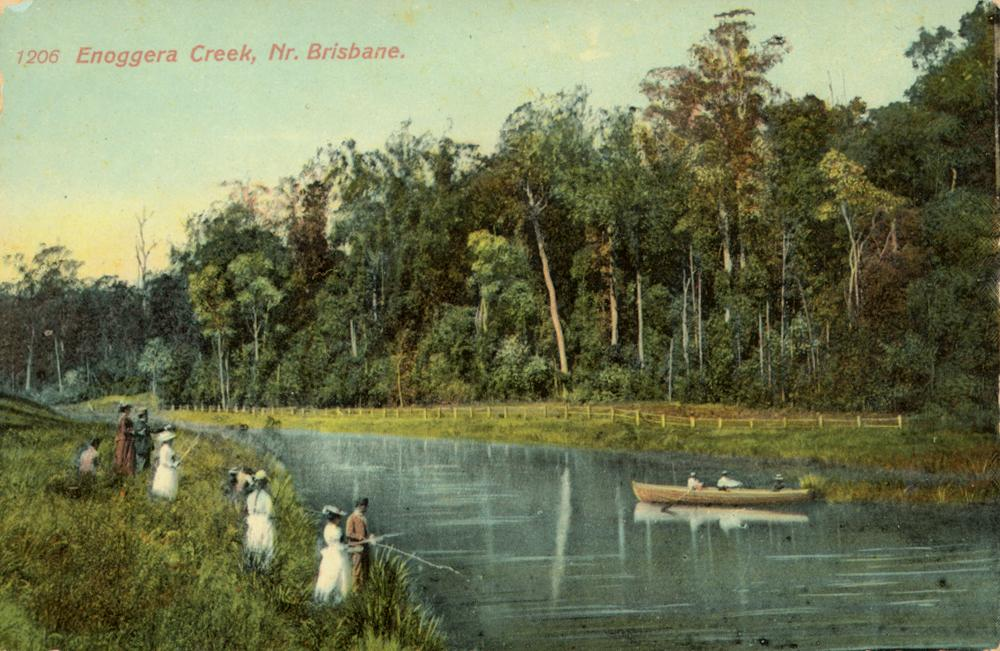
Fishing and boating parties at Enoggera Creek, circa 1900

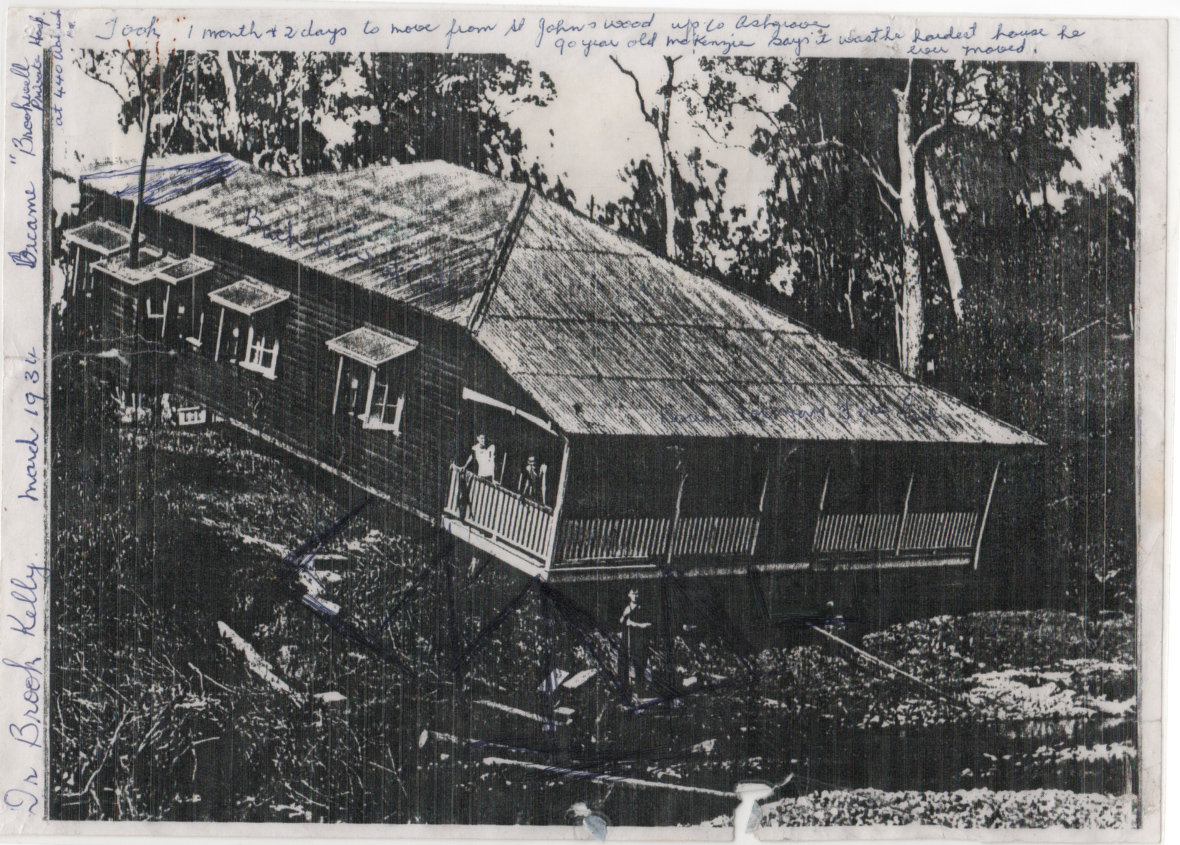
Relocating a house from St Johns Wood to Ashgrove, 1934

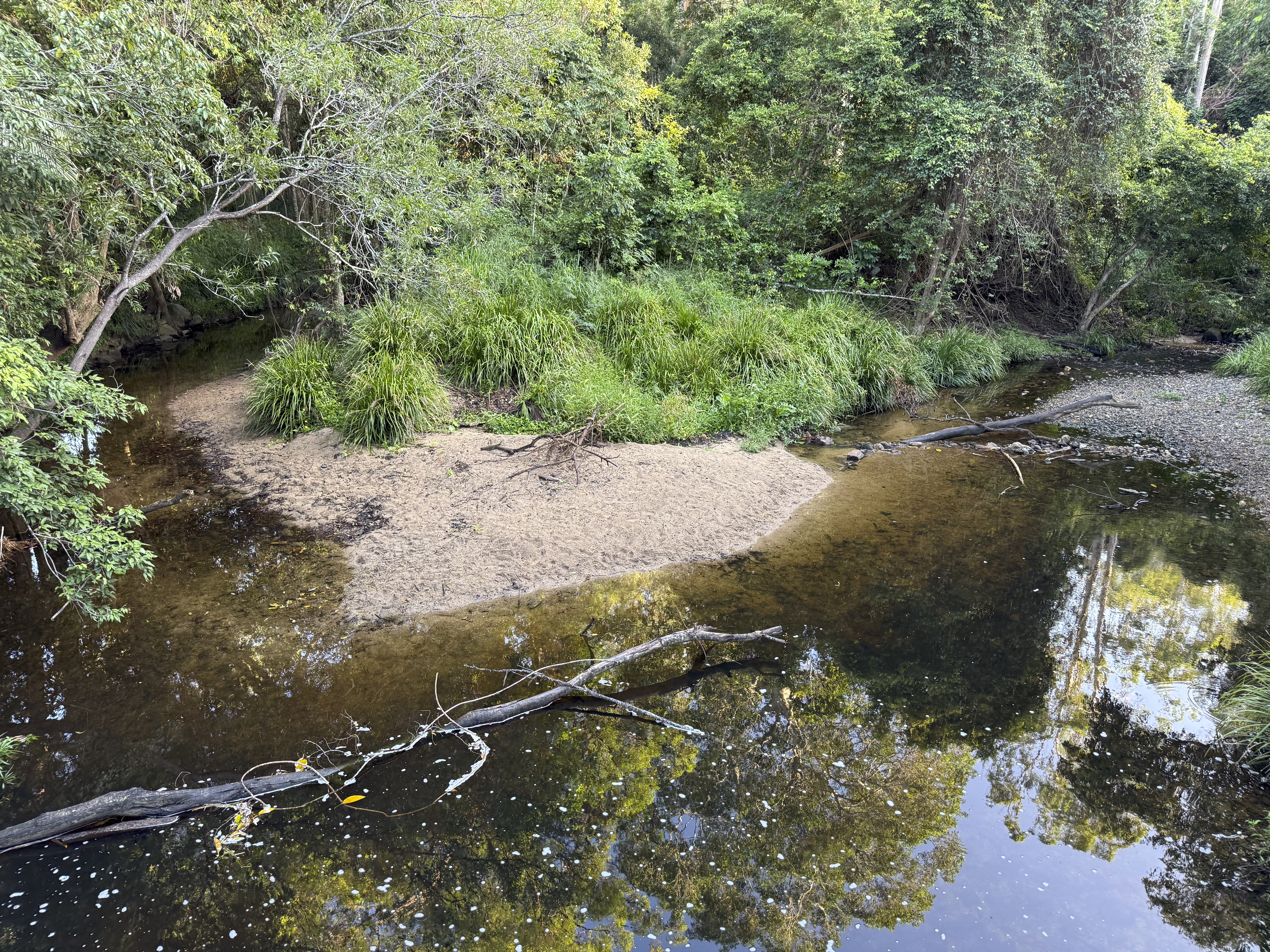
Tributary Fish Creek on left entering Enoggera Creek on right, 2026

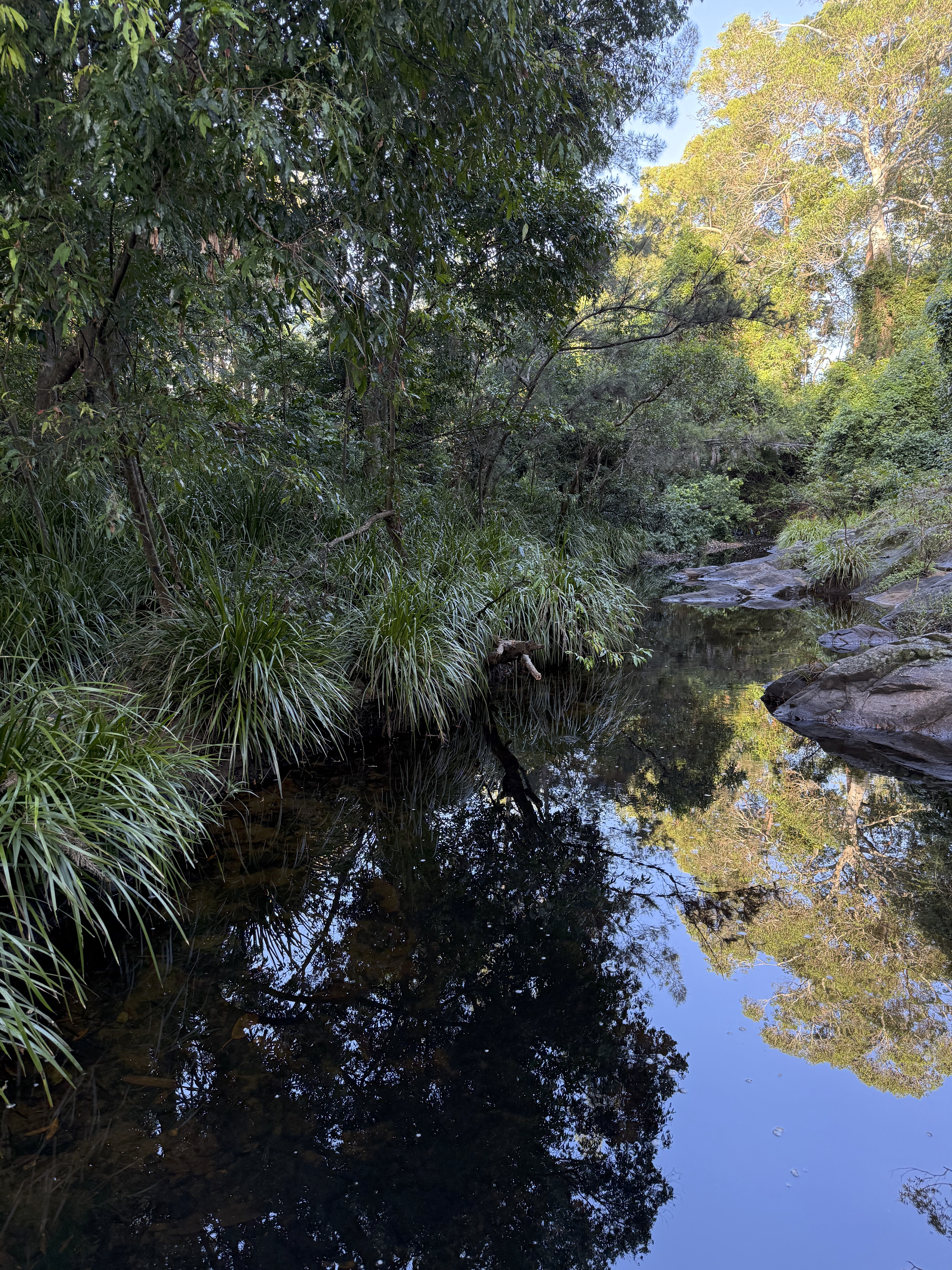
Enoggera Creek at The Gap looking upstream, 2026

== See also ==
- Kedron Brook
- List of rivers of Australia
- Moggill Creek
