= Enoggera Reservoir, Queensland =

Enoggera Reservoir
- Suburb
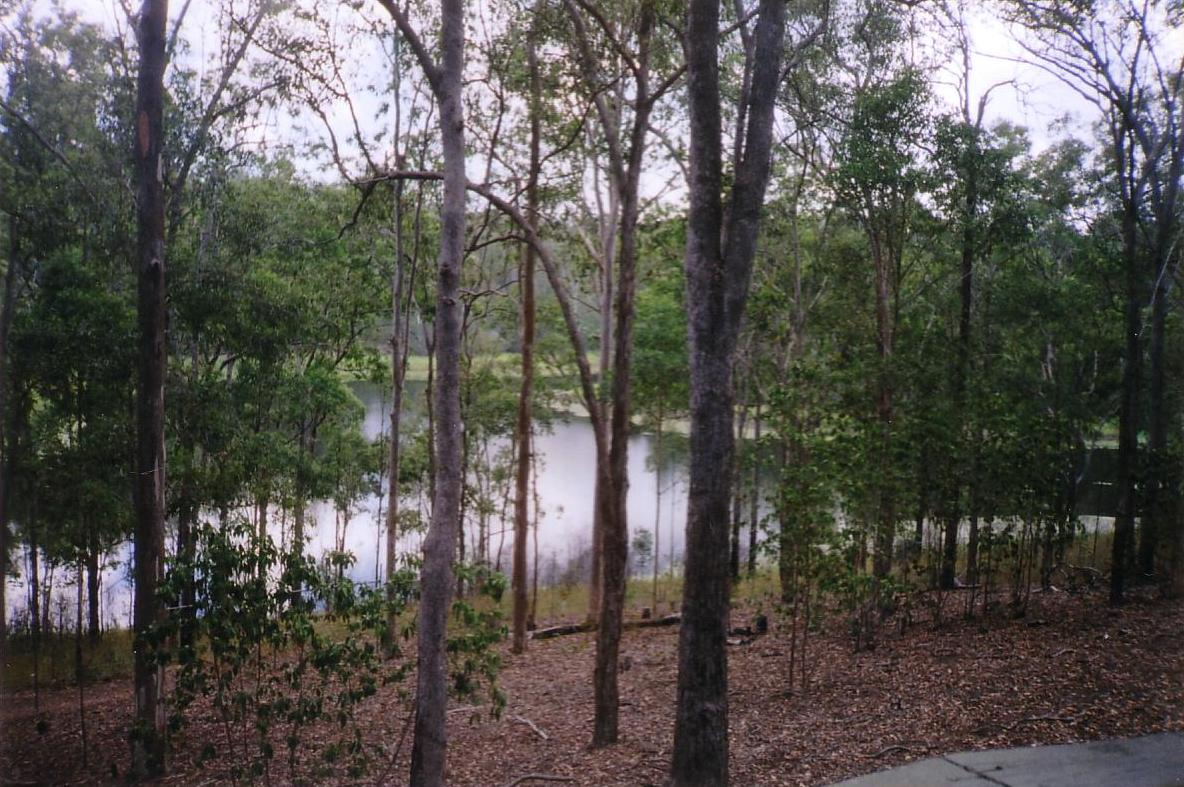
- Enoggera Reservoir Dam

- Interactive map of Enoggera Reservoir
- Coordinates: 27.4333°S 152.8708°E
- Country: Australia
- State: Queensland
- City: Brisbane
- LGA: City of Brisbane (The Gap Ward)
- Location: 19.2 km (11.9 mi) WNW of Brisbane CBD
- Established: 15 December 1990

Government
  - State electorate: Cooper
  - Federal division: Ryan

Area
  - Total: 37.8 km^{2} (14.6 sq mi)

Population
  - Total: 33 (2021 census)
  - Density: 0.873/km^{2} (2.26/sq mi)
- Time zone: UTC+10:00 (AEST)
- Postcode: 4520
Suburbs around Enoggera Reservoir
Mount Nebo; Highvale	Jollys Lookout; Camp Mountain	Upper Kedron
Lake Manchester	Enoggera Reservoir	The Gap
Lake Manchester	Upper Brookfield	Brookfield

Enoggera Reservoir is an outer north-western suburb in the City of Brisbane, Queensland, Australia. In the 2021 census, Enoggera Reservoir had a population of 33 people.

== Geography ==
The suburbs borders City of Moreton Bay to the north. It contains the neighbourhood of Peewee Bend (27.4233°S 152.8844°E).

== History ==
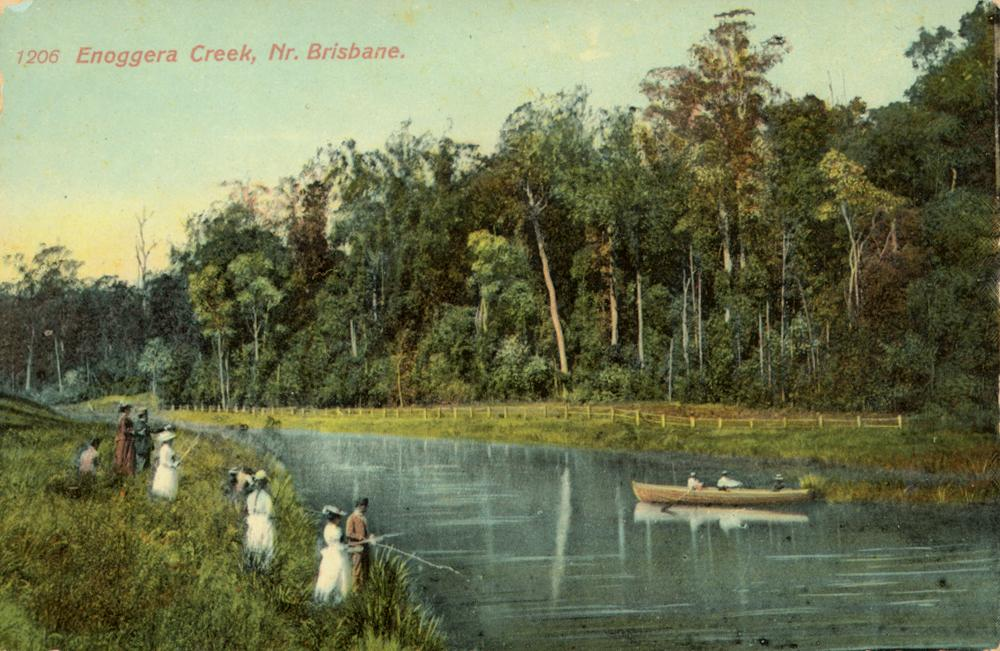
Fishing and boating parties at Enoggera Creek, circa 1900

The Enoggera Reservoir suburb is named after the Enoggera Dam. The name Enoggera is a corruption of the Yuggera word yauar-ngari meaning corroboree ground. The suburb was officially named and bounded on 15 December 1990.

As of 12 February 2011, sufficient water inflows returned the reservoir to usable levels, and water is now used to supply neighbouring suburbs. Prior to this the reservoir levels were insufficient for water supply, primarily due to the drought which was experienced by South-East Queensland prior to the January 2011 floods.

== Demographics ==
In the 2011 census, Enoggera Reservoir had a population of 24 people.

In the 2016 census, Enoggera Reservoir had a population of 25 people.

In the 2021 census, Enoggera Reservoir had a population of 33 people.

== Heritage listings ==
Enoggera Reservoir has a number of heritage-listed sites, including:

- Enoggera Dam, 30 & 50 Mount Nebo Road (27.4473°S 152.927°E)
- Slab Hut Farm, 847 Mount Nebo Road (27.427°S 152.8776°E)

== Education ==
There are no schools in Enoggera Reservoir. The nearest government primary schools are The Gap State School in The Gap to the east and Mount Nebo State School in Mount Nebo to the north-east. The nearest government secondary school is The Gap State High School in The Gap to the east.
