= Ithaca Embankments =

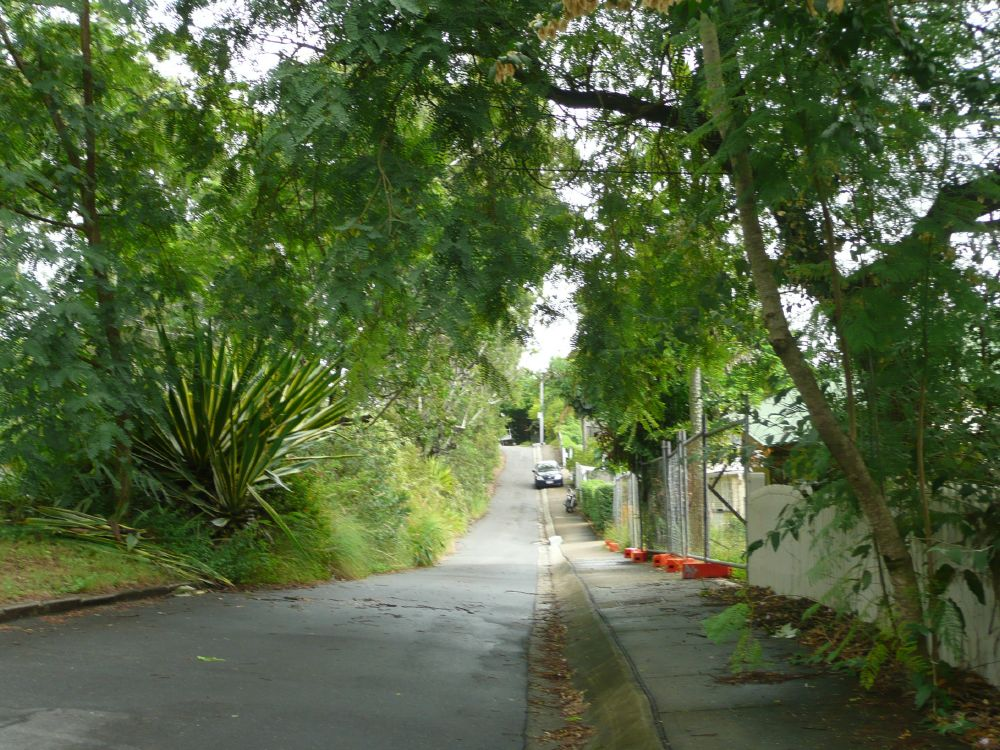
- Ithaca Embankments, Fernberg Road near Government House, 2009

- Location within Queensland Location within Australia
- 27.4562°S 152.9969°E
- Location: Kelvin Grove & Red Hill & Paddington, Brisbane, Queensland, Australia

History
- Design period: 1914–1919 (World War I)
- Built: c. 1917–c. 1923

Site notes
- Architect: Alexander Jolly

Queensland Heritage Register
- Official name: Ithaca Embankments, Embankment – corner Latrobe & Macgregor Tces, Embankment – Northam Avenue, Embankments - Fernberg Rd near Government House, Embankment – Musgrave Rd opp Upper Clifton Tce, Embankments – Waterworks Rd & Lintern St, Embankments – Windsor Rd, Prospect Tce & Victoria St, Embankments – Latrobe Tce opp Gladstone St, Embankment – Musgrave Rd opp Confederate St, Embankments – corner Macgregor & Rockbourne Tces
- Type: state heritage (landscape, built)
- Designated: 2 March 1993
- Reference no.: 601209
- Significant period: c. 1917–c. 1923 (fabric)
- Significant components: garden – bed/s, trees/plantings, wall/s – retaining, steps/stairway, pathway/walkway, fencing

Ithaca Embankments is a heritage-listed group of embankments in the former Town of Ithaca and now in the suburbs of Kelvin Grove, Red Hill and Paddington in Brisbane, Queensland, Australia. They were designed by Alexander Jolly and built from c. 1917 to c. 1923. They were added to the Queensland Heritage Register on 2 March 1993.

== History ==
The rock gardens and early stone retaining walls and edgings on the embankments at Red Hill were established c. 1917 for the Ithaca Town Council. In 1918 MacGregor Terrace and Waterworks Road were similarly landscaped after road works, as were Fernberg Road and Northam Avenue in 1923. The remnant Musgrave Road plantings most likely date from 1917 to 18. The plantings and stone retaining wall along the Latrobe Terrace embankment probably were associated with the landscaping of Cook's Hill in the early 1920s.

In the first decade of the 20th century, Ithaca experienced a housing and population boom largely attributable to the expansion of the tramways through the area. Subsequently, in the 1910s the Ithaca Town Council embarked on a programme of civic improvements which included the establishment of Lang Park (1917), the Ithaca Swimming Pool (1917), and the Ithaca Children's Playground (also known as the Neal Macrossan Playground) (1918); the formation and metalling of roads; tree planting; and the establishment of numerous embankment gardens, small reserves and street gardens throughout the suburbs of Red Hill, Kelvin Grove, Paddington, Rosalie, Bardon, and parts of Milton.

Because of the hilly terrain, many of the new streets were divided, leaving embankments which the Ithaca Town Council considered were cheaper to plant and beautify than to cut down. This approach placed the Council at the forefront of street beautification projects in the Brisbane metropolitan area. By comparison, Brisbane Municipal Council, under the direction of Parks Superintendent Harry Moore, established rock gardens and flower beds along roads such as River Terrace at Kangaroo Point, but generally did not plant out embankments. The South Brisbane Municipal Council appears to have limited street beautification to weed eradication and tree planting.

This innovation in Brisbane civic landscaping led to Ithaca Town Council receiving numerous requests from other councils, interstate as well as Queensland, for photographs and plans of Ithaca street improvements. At the second Australian Town Planning Conference and Exhibition, held in Brisbane in July–August 1918, the Ithaca Town Council exhibited photographs showing treatment of ugly cuttings and street improvements which beautify the street and at the same time solve practical difficulties.

Much of the impetus for the work came from Ithaca Town Council's landscape gardener, Alexander Jolly, (father of the first Mayor of Greater Brisbane, William Jolly), who was a horticultural enthusiast. Son of a Scottish farmer, Jolly had arrived in Brisbane in 1879, aged 22 years. He was head gardener on Alexander Stewart's Glen Lyon estate at Ashgrove for at least seven years before he went to work for the Ithaca Town Council.

Jolly was a self-educated man, whose lifetime of gardening experience transformed the Ithaca townscape in the period c. 1915-25. His work was praised by the local community, the Ithaca Town Council, and even Sir Matthew Nathan, Governor of Queensland, who in 1925 wrote that Jolly's good taste has given constant pleasure to so many of us Ithaca residents. Some of Jolly's more prominent projects included the rockeries along Musgrave and Waterworks Roads; the landscaping of Cook's Hill; and the Ithaca War Memorial garden, which, after his death, was named Alexander Jolly Park, in memory of one of the most esteemed men in the district, and as a unique tribute "to the pick and shovel". Only small sections of the Waterworks Road rockeries remain, and most of the Cook's Hill garden was destroyed when the Paddington Tramways Substation was erected in 1929–30.

The rock gardens listed above survive as some of the more intact examples of Jolly's work. They also remain as testament to the Ithaca Town Council's public consciousness and active involvement in creating a distinctive town environment, in the early years of the 20th century.

== Description ==
These Ithaca Town Council embankments display similar landscape design, planting, materials, and idiosyncratic features of Alexander Jolly's work. One of the most intact is the Windsor Road embankment, extending from the corner of Prospect Terrace to the corner of Victoria Street, Kelvin Grove.

=== No 1 embankment ===
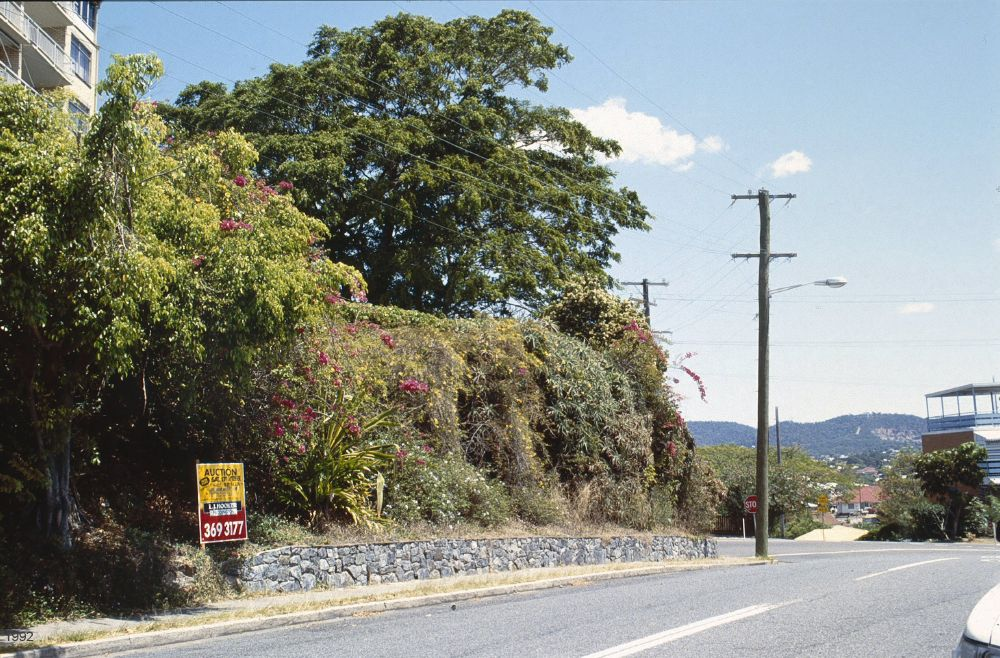
Embankment at Prospect Tce and Windsor Street, 1992

Embankment on Windsor Rd, Kelvin Grove, from Prospect Tce to Victoria St. This embankment surrounds the western crest of Red Hill, bordering Morris Tor apartments on the corner of Prospect Terrace and Windsor Road to the north, continues along Windsor Road in front of Nos 21, 19 and 15 to the corner of Victoria Street and culminates in front of No 65 Victoria Street to the south.

The embankment is covered in lush vegetation, including at least six varieties of Agave sp.; queen palms (Syagrus romanzoffiana); Camphor laurel (Cinnamomum camphora); Bougainvillaea sp.; and a number of small shrubs popular in the early part of the twentieth century. The embankment is bordered by a concrete footpath and has several areas of natural rock face. There is a low three tier schist wall along part of Prospect Terrace and in front of Nos 21 and 19 Windsor Road.

A recent low bluestone wall borders the corner of Prospect Terrace and Windsor Road.

A set of concrete stairs is located on the Windsor Road side of the Morris Tor apartments and may have been for the earlier house which stood on the site. A sloping pathway with a timber railing fence leads through the vegetation to No 21 and is bordered by a low three tier dry stone porphyry wall.

A narrow driveway is located on the south boundary of No 19 and is surrounded by substantial groupings of agave sp. A driveway is located on the southern boundary of No 15 along the Victoria Street frontage providing access to No 15 and to No 65 Victoria Street and has planting to both the upper and lower sides. The embankment becomes a rock face in front of No 65.

Large trees are located along the frontages, and within the site boundaries, of the above properties and overhang the embankment below. There is one weeping fig (Ficus benjamina) and one Camphor laurel (Cinnamomum camphora) in front of Morris Tor, two weeping figs (Ficus benjamina) in front of both Nos 21 and 19, a Mango (Mangifera indica) in front of No 15 and four weeping figs (Ficus benjamina) and an avenue of queen palms (Syagrus romanzoffiana) in front of No 65. These trees, together with the embankment on Red Hill, form a local landmark visible from the surrounding ridges.

=== No 2 embankment ===
Embankment at corner of Windsor & Musgrave Rds, Red Hill, below the Red Hill Post Office, and an opposite divided street retaining wall with lower embankment. Two trees stand on the street corner with a concrete retaining wall and timber rail fence below. The planted embankment begins at the edge of the retaining wall and contains several varieties of agave sp., palms and small shrubs and is bounded by a bitumen footpath and a section of low dry stone wall. On the opposite side of the road is a lower stone retaining wall with a timber rail fence and concrete footpath on the top side and narrow roadway along the base. This roadway has a short embankment on the lower side to the corner of Zig Zag Street. This embankment has a section of stone retaining wall and several varieties of agave sp., trees and grasses.

=== No 3 embankment ===
Divided street embankment on Musgrave Rd, Red Hill, between Federal & Confederate Sts. This embankment contains a particularly intact section of dry stone wall which displays varying forms of construction. The embankment is bounded by a bitumen footpath with a timber rail fence along the top. There are several varieties of agave sp., palms, trees and small shrubs as well as areas of rock face.

=== No 4 embankment ===
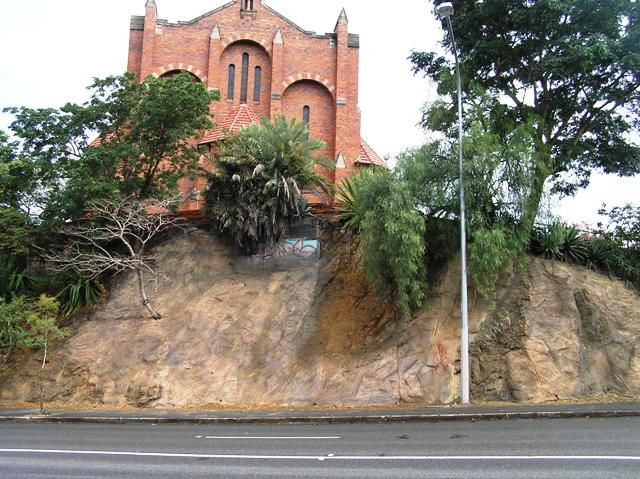
Embankment, Musgrave Road opposite Upper Clifton Terrace 2009

Embankment on Musgrave Rd, Red Hill, below St Brigid's Church. This tall embankment has a retaining wall along the top, which forms the forecourt to St Brigid's Church, and is bounded by a bitumen footpath along the base. There are areas of rock face, several varieties of agave sp., trees, small shrubs and grasses.

=== No 5 embankment ===
Divided street embankment on Waterworks Rd, Red Hill, between Mornington & Lintern Sts, and returning into the latter. This embankment has a timber rail fence along the top and is bounded by Waterworks Road along the base. It has large sections of rock face with several varieties of agave sp., small shrubs and grasses, and a concrete stair at the street corner.

=== No 6 embankment ===
Divided street embankment on Fernberg Rd, Paddington, near the intersection with Kaye St, and an opposite embankment in front of Government House. The divided street embankment has sections of dry stone wall on the lower side, with several varieties of agave sp., trees and small shrubs. The opposite embankment also has sections of dry stone wall, of a different form of construction, and several varieties of agave sp., trees, palms, small shrubs and a grassed footpath.

=== No 7 embankment ===
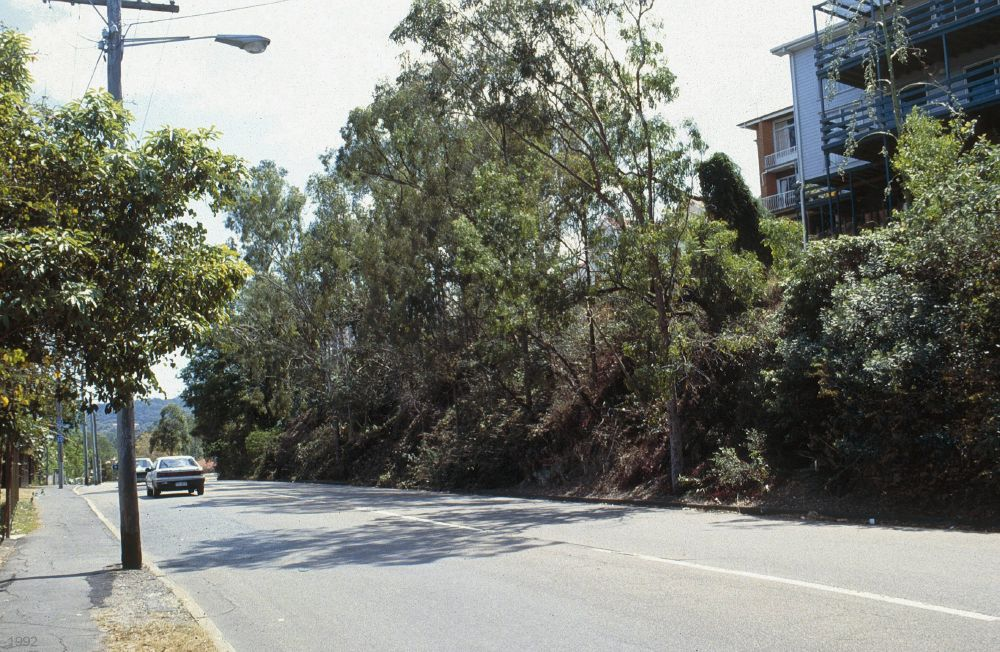
Embankment on the corner of Latrobe and Macgregor Terraces, 1992

Embankment on MacGregor Tce, Paddington, from Tooth Ave to Latrobe Tce, and returning into the latter. This tall embankment is bounded by residential properties on the top side and roadway along the base. The embankment has lush vegetation, including several varieties of agave sp., trees, small shrubs and vines with areas of rock face and remnants of a dry stone wall.

=== No 8 embankment ===
Embankment at corner of MacGregor & Rockbourne Tces, and returning into both streets. This embankment is bounded by a dry stone wall, prominent on the street corner, and bitumen footpath with areas of rock face along MacGregor Terrace. There are several varieties of agave sp., trees, palms and small shrubs.

=== No 9 embankment ===
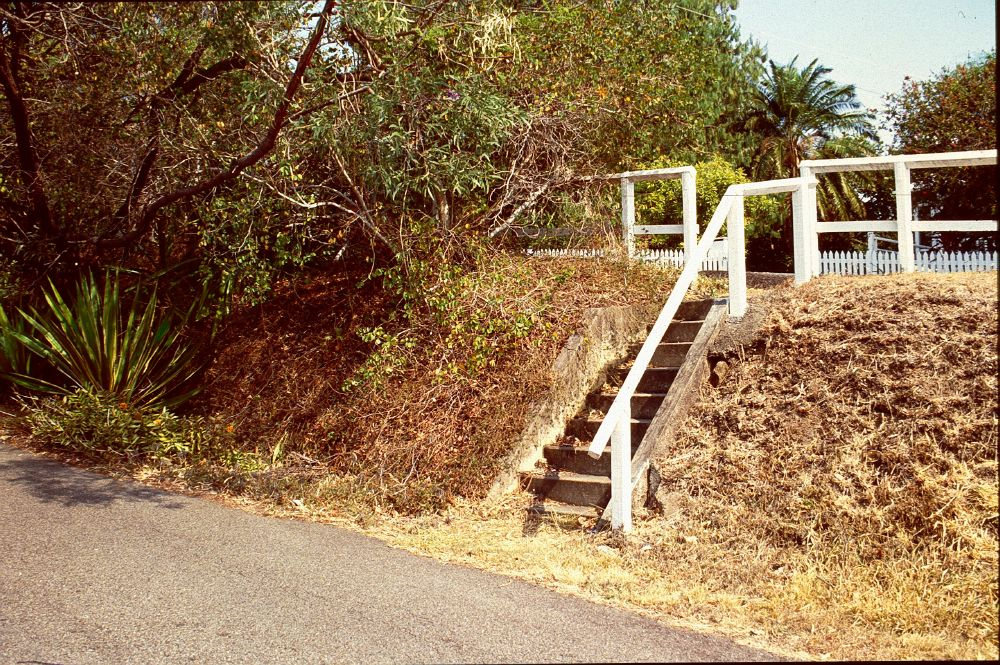
Embankment, Northam Avenue, 1992

Divided street embankment on Northam Ave, Bardon, from MacGregor Tce to approximately half the length of Northam Ave. This long embankment has a timber rail fence along the top side, a section of dry stone wall along the base and a concrete stair towards the end. There are several varieties of agave sp., trees, palms, small shrubs and grasses.

=== No 10 embankment ===
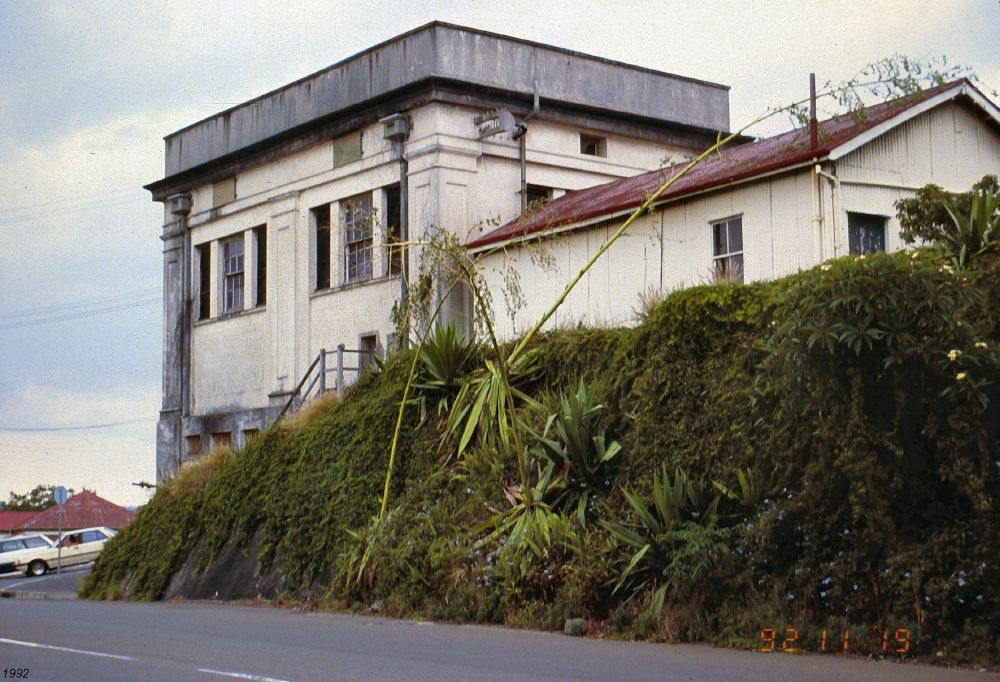
Embankment on Latrobe Terrace

Embankment on Latrobe Tce, Paddington, from Enoggera Tce to the base of Ithaca War Memorial. The embankment is bounded by the Ithaca War Memorial, the former Ithaca Fire Station and Paddington Tramways Substation along the top side, with Latrobe Terrace along the base. There is a section of dry stone wall at the Memorial Park end with a substantial grouping of agave sp., and a section of dry stone wall at the Enoggera Terrace end, a remnant of the earlier gardens on the site. There are several varieties of agave sp., trees, palms, small shrubs, vines and grasses.

== Heritage listing ==
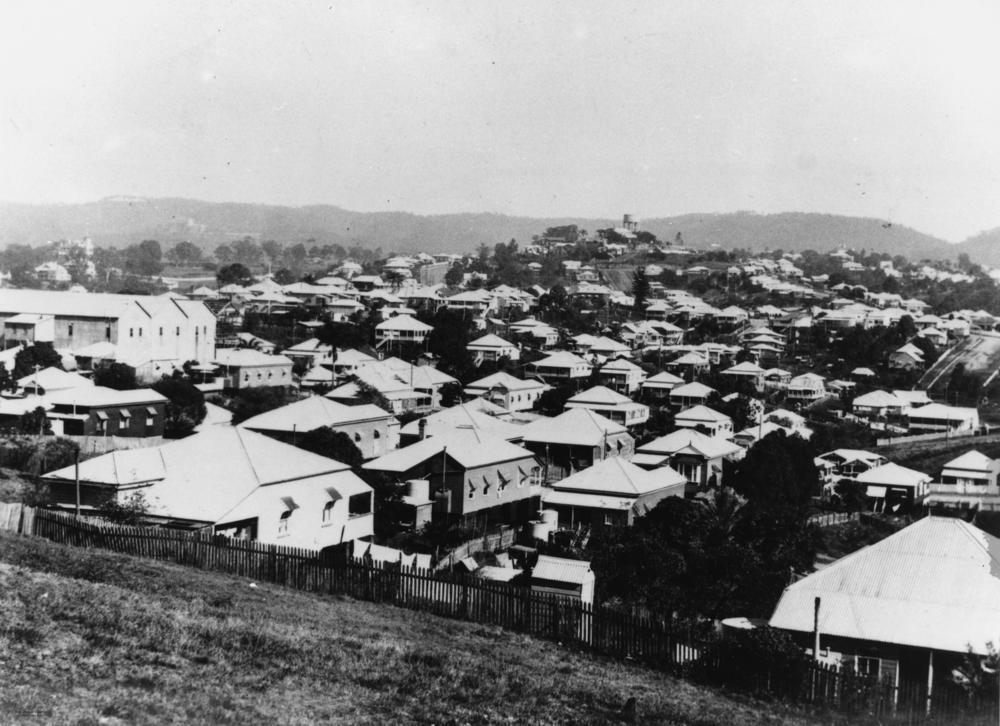
View of Paddington in 1929, taken from 116 Enoggera Terrace looking towards Latrobe Terrace.

Ithaca Embankments were listed on the Queensland Heritage Register on 2 March 1993 having satisfied the following criteria.

The place is important in demonstrating the evolution or pattern of Queensland's history.

The Ithaca Embankments are important in demonstrating the evolution of the Town of Ithaca, providing evidence of the active involvement of the Ithaca Town Council in landscape improvements, and its conscious attempt to enhance the quality of life for Ithaca residents in the early part of the 20th century.

The place is important in demonstrating the principal characteristics of a particular class of cultural places.

They are important in demonstrating the principal characteristics of the Ithaca Town Council's early 20th century street beautification projects, being some of the best surviving examples, and provide important surviving evidence of stone retaining wall and edging techniques practised by Brisbane's public landscape gardeners in the early 20th century.

The place is important because of its aesthetic significance.

They exhibit aesthetic characteristics valued by the community, in particular their contribution to the townscape of Brisbane's inner western suburbs.

The place has a special association with the life or work of a particular person, group or organisation of importance in Queensland's history.

They are significant also for their special association with the work of Ithaca Town Council's landscape gardener, Alexander Jolly, and his transformation of the Ithaca townscape in the early 20th century.

== See also ==
- Parks and gardens of Brisbane
