= Ithaca Fire Station =

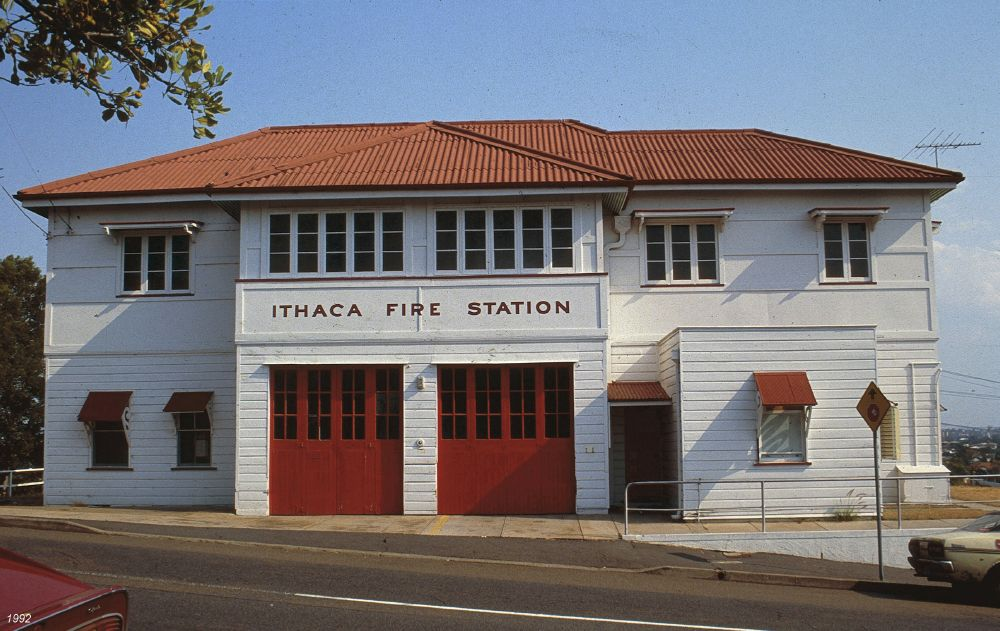
- Former Ithaca Fire Station, 1992

- Location within Queensland Location within Australia
- 27.4586°S 153.0003°E
- Location: 140 Enoggera Terrace, Paddington, Queensland, Australia

History
- Design period: 1914–1919 (World War I)
- Built: 1918–1928

Site notes
- Architect: Alfred Joseph Harper

Queensland Heritage Register
- Official name: Ithaca Fire Station (former)
- Type: state heritage (built)
- Designated: 2 March 1993
- Reference no.: 601199
- Significant period: 1917–1918, 1928 (fabric); 1918–1992 (historical)
- Significant components: engine room / appliance bay (fire station), store/s / storeroom / storehouse, recreation area/room/building/hall/centre, wall/s – retaining, residential accommodation – staff quarters
- Builders: Frederick Enchelmaier

Ithaca Fire Station is a heritage-listed fire station at 140 Enoggera Terrace, Paddington, Queensland, Australia. It was designed by station superintendent Alfred Joseph Harper and built in 1918–1919; an upper level was designed by Atkinson, Powell and Conrad and built by Frederick Enchelmaier in 1928. It was added to the Queensland Heritage Register on 2 March 1993.

== History ==
The ground floor of this timber and fibro-cement building was erected in 1918–19 as the headquarters of the Ithaca Fire Brigade. The brigade was formed in 1918 by the merger of the Ithaca and Milton Volunteer Fire Brigades, and provided the inner western suburbs with a permanent firefighting force of four, with six auxiliary staff.

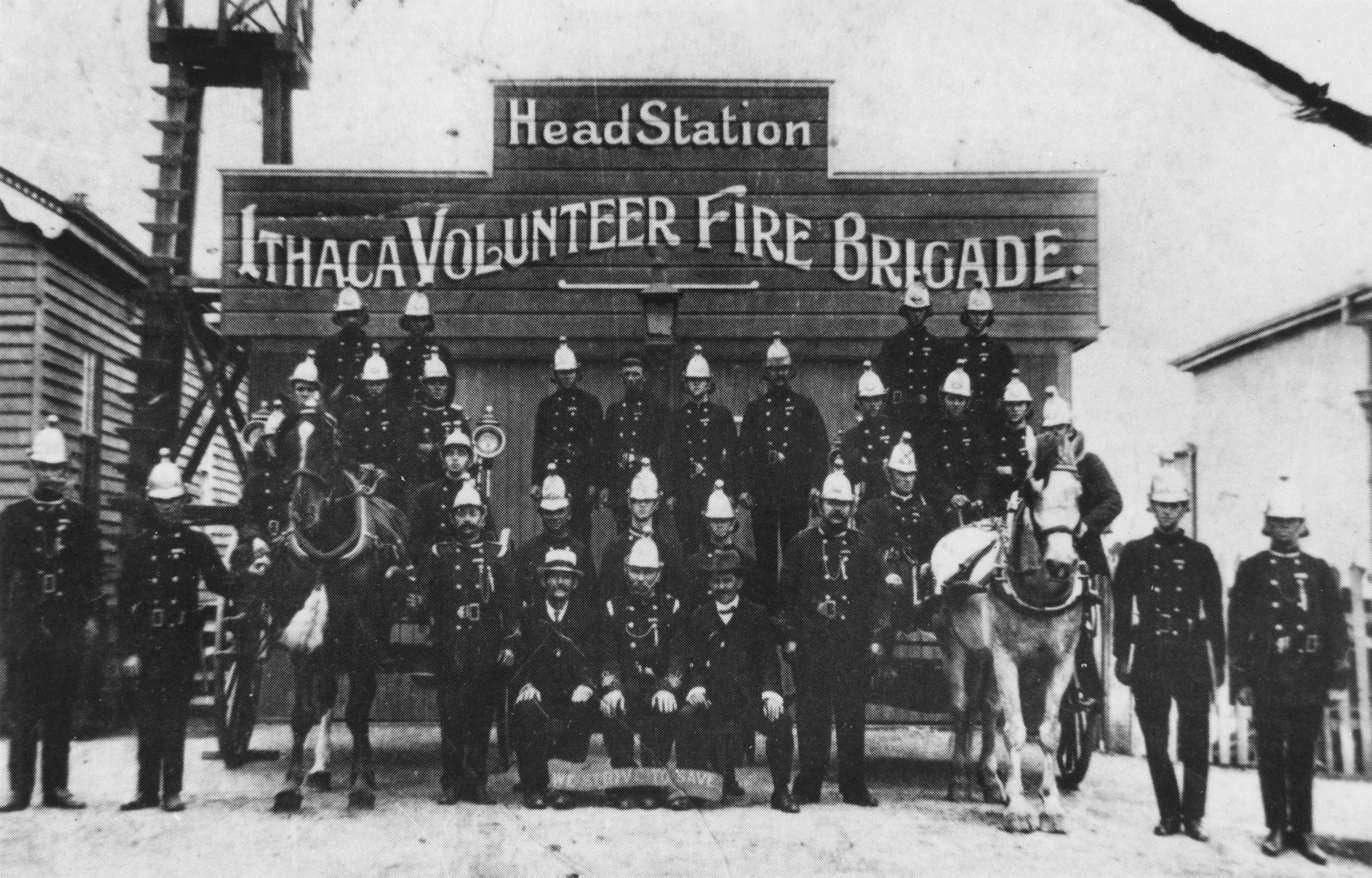
Ithaca Volunteer Fire Brigade

The building was erected on Cook's Hill, at the junction of Latrobe and Enoggera Terraces, near where the Ithaca Volunteer Fire Brigade station had stood. The new building was constructed by the firefighters themselves at a cost of £500, using materials from dismantled fire stations. It was designed by the superintendent, Alfred Joseph Harper, who also supervised the work. Site excavation, terracing, and installation of a septic tank were carried out by the Ithaca Town Council, who were eager to promote an improved firefighting service in the town.

The station was opened on 8 February 1919 by the Mayor of Ithaca, Alderman Kaye. It comprised an engine room, recreation room, large dormitory, bathroom and verandah. Located within the grounds were a large shed, which possibly pre-dated the station building, and a fire hose tower, removed from the former Milton Volunteers' Baroona Road station.

In 1921 Brisbane's fire brigades combined to form the Metropolitan Fire Brigades District, and the station continued to be known as the Ithaca Fire Station.

Extensive landscaping of Cook's Hill was undertaken in 1919 by the Ithaca Town Council's gardener, Alexander Jolly. Most of this was destroyed with the construction of the adjacent tramway substation in 1929–30.

In 1928 a first floor was added as accommodation for the officer in charge. The architects were Atkinson, Powell, Conrad and the builder was Frederick Enchelmaier. During the Second World War the building was a base for the Wartime Auxiliary Fire Service.

The fire station functioned until August 1992, when it was vacated. It was the longest operating fire station in the Brisbane area. The hose tower was removed some time after 1981.

The galvanised iron storage shed which was located between the fire station building and the adjacent substation was removed in 1995.

== Description ==
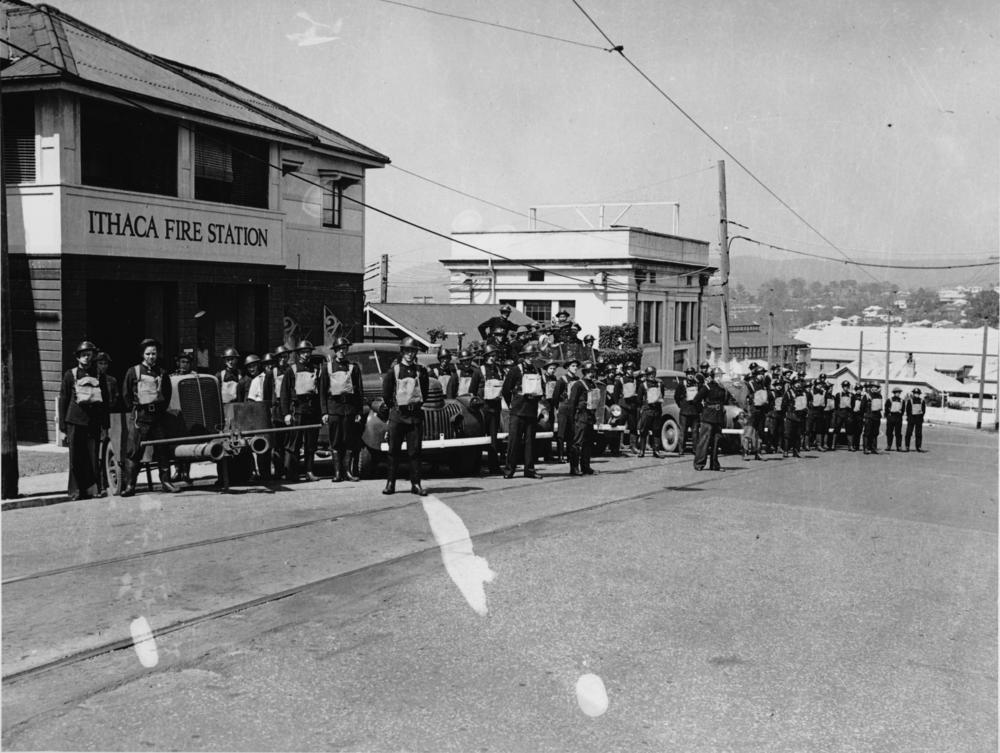
Ithaca Fire Station, circa 1942

The former Ithaca Fire Station, situated near the junction of Enoggera and Latrobe Terraces, is a two storeyed building with a hipped corrugated fibro cement roof.

The building is clad with chamferboards at the ground floor and fibro cement to the first floor. The north elevation has a central projecting vehicle bay with two sets of folding timber and glass garage doors. The ground floor has timber sash windows with decorative timber bracketed window hoods, while on the first floor there are casement windows.

Internally, the central vehicle bay has a concrete floor with timber floors to the locker room, recreation area and offices on each side. The ground floor walls have tongue and groove boards, the ceilings are boarded and a recessed bay with mottled glass panels opens off the vehicle bay to the locker room. The first floor has tongue and groove boards to the walls, fibro-cement ceiling, terrazzo floors to the bathroom and toilet, and timber floors elsewhere. Some of the original fire station fittings survive.

== Heritage listing ==
The former Ithaca Fire Station was listed on the Queensland Heritage Register on 2 March 1993 having satisfied the following criteria.

The place is important in demonstrating the evolution or pattern of Queensland's history.

The Ithaca Fire Station, constructed in two stages, 1918–19 and 1928, is important in demonstrating the evolution of Queensland's history, as it is an integral part of a group of civic buildings and places along Enoggera Terrace which demonstrate the identity of the former Ithaca Town.

The place is important in demonstrating the principal characteristics of a particular class of cultural places.

It demonstrates the principal characteristics of an early 20th century suburban fire station.

The place is important because of its aesthetic significance.

It exhibits aesthetic characteristics valued by the community, including its landmark quality and contribution to the Paddington townscape.

The place has a strong or special association with a particular community or cultural group for social, cultural or spiritual reasons.

The place has strong social and cultural association with the Paddington and Brisbane communities as an integral member of an historic group on Cook's Hill which includes the adjacent Ithaca War Memorial and parkland, Paddington Tramways Substation, and Ithaca Embankments.
