= Paddington Tramways Substation =

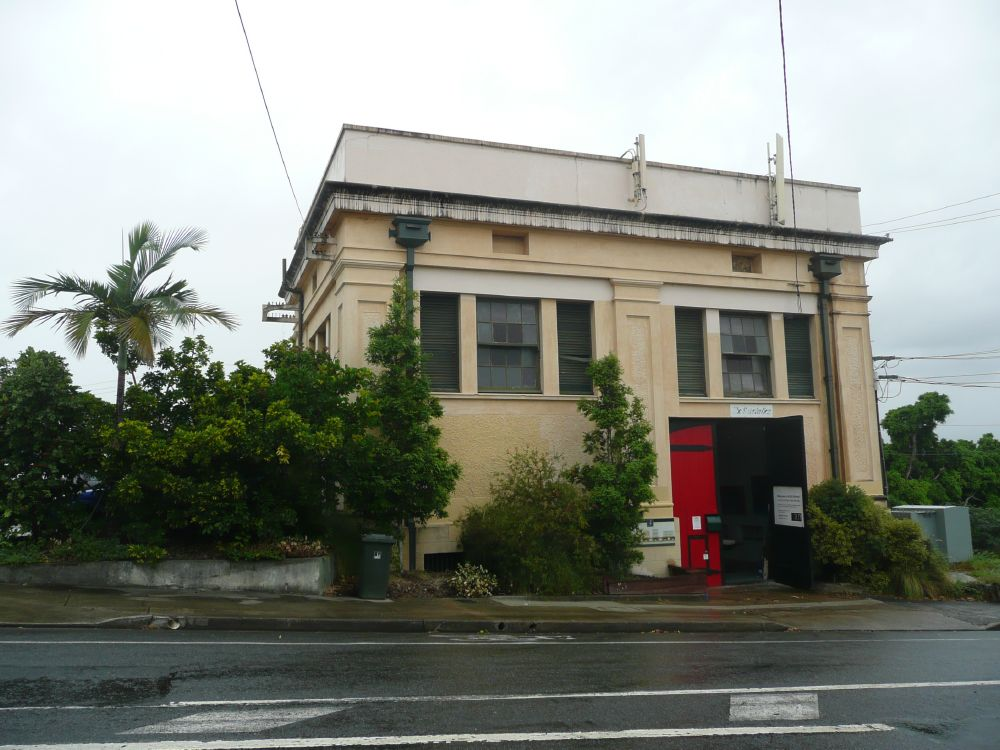
- Paddington Tramways Substation, 2009

- Location within Queensland Location within Australia
- 27.4586°S 152.9999°E
- Location: 150 Enoggera Terrace, Paddington, City of Brisbane, Queensland, Australia

History
- Design period: 1919–1930s (interwar period)
- Built: 1929–1930

Site notes
- Architect: Roy Rusden Ogg
- Architectural style: Classicism

Queensland Heritage Register
- Official name: The Substation, Paddington Tramways Substation
- Type: state heritage (built, landscape)
- Designated: 22 March 1993
- Reference no.: 601198
- Significant period: 1929–1969 (historical); 1929–ongoing (social)
- Significant components: turbine house, views to, embankment – road, crane / gantry, substation – tramway, furniture/fittings

Paddington Tramways Substation is a heritage-listed former electrical substation at 150 Enoggera Terrace, Paddington, City of Brisbane, Queensland, Australia. It was designed by Roy Rusden Ogg and built from 1929 to 1930. It was added to the Queensland Heritage Register on 22 March 1993.

== History ==
The former tramways substation was erected in 1929–30, during a period of tramways expansion which followed the Brisbane City Council's 1925 acquisition of the tramways system from the Brisbane Tramways Trust. It was erected on Cook's Hill, along the Paddington Line, on land which was formerly part of the adjacent Ithaca Fire Station. The Brisbane Tramways Company, a private enterprise formed in 1895, introduced the first electric trams to Brisbane in mid-1897. Following lobbying by the Ithaca Shire Council, a tramway was extended along Musgrave Road to Red Hill, and a line was laid along Caxton Street and Given Terrace as far as Latrobe Terrace in 1898. The Red Hill line was extended to Ashgrove in 1924, and the Paddington line was extended to Bardon in 1937. The spread of the tramways network was a catalyst for residential development in the western suburbs.

In 1926 the Greater Brisbane Council, anxious to control the city's electricity supply, decided to build the Brisbane Powerhouse at New Farm, under the supervision of the BCC Tramways Department. Opened on 28 June 1928, New Farm distributed 11000 volts AC power to a network of eleven suburban tramway substations erected in the 1920s and 1930s. The function of the Paddington substation, the seventh in the network, was to assist the Petrie Terrace substation (erected 1927–28) in providing a better distribution of power to the increased western suburbs tram services.

Considerable attention was given to the design of these substations. Roy Rusden Ogg, the tramways' architect and construction engineer from 1926 until the late 1930s, in conjunction with tramways' chief engineers William Muir Nelson (1925–26) and William Arundell (1926–49?), designed at least ten Brisbane substations between 1926 and 1936, and the first two stages of the New Farm powerhouse (1927–29 and 1934–36). Ogg also designed the Tramways Department's Head Office building on Coronation Drive (1929). The Paddington substation, constructed of bricks and structural steel from the old Countess Street power house (closed in mid-1928), was the first of his substation designs to incorporate a parapet wall, flat roof and exterior render.

The Paddington substation was automatic, equipped with an 1100 KVA transformer, a British-Thomson-Houston 1000 kW rotary converter, switchgear, support services, and an overhead crane (designed by the Tramways Department). The substation received 11000 volts AC electricity from the New Farm Power station, via an underground feeder cable. The transformer reduced this supply, which the rotary converter then converted to 600 volts DC for the tramways network.

The substation commenced operation on 11 August 1930 and remained in service until the phasing out of Brisbane's trams in the late 1960s. In 1969 the Paddington line was closed, the substation's electrical equipment was removed, and the building became a storage depot. In 1985, Hands On Art was given a fifteen-year lease of the building.

In 2014, Hands On Art was still operating from the building and was running monthly "vintage and artisan" markets.

== Description ==
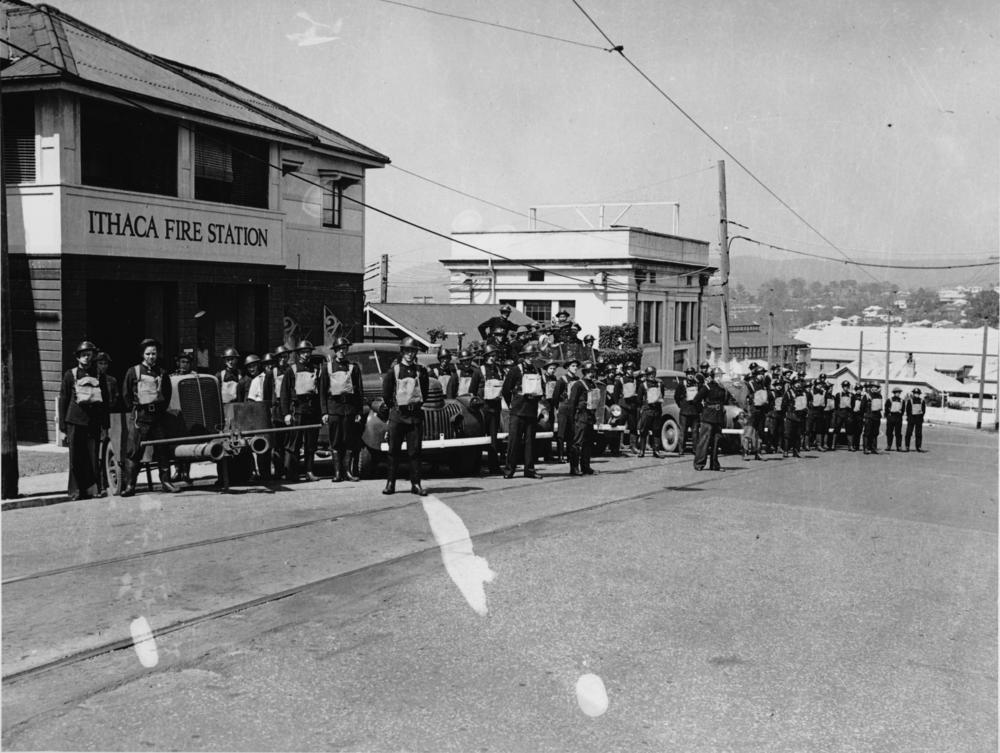
Paddington Tramways Substation (white building, centre), circa 1942

The former tramway substation is a rendered masonry building with a flat concrete roof behind a parapet wall. It is situated prominently adjacent to the intersection of Latrobe and Enoggera Terraces.

The symmetrical facades demonstrate a classical influence in their design. The building has corner pilasters with the longer north and south elevations having a central pilaster. The building has a heavy cornice, feature panels of rough render and a base which is scribed to suggest large size stone blocks.

The building has large sash windows with mottled glass panes with a panel of galvanised iron louvres to either side of each window. There are also ventilation panels in the base and below the cornice. A set of large timber doors is located on the north, which has been painted bright colours, and a section of the base has also been painted.

Internally the building has concrete floors, painted brick walls and steel beams to the roof, with metal covers to the panels of louvres and pink glass inserts to the centre of the sash windows. The east end of the space has a raised floor accessed via a steep metal stair with a more recent steel pipe railing.

The original arrangement of equipment is evident. Floor ducting for the power supply is located in the west end of the space but has been filled in. The high tension switchgear and 1100 KVA transformer have been removed. The upper level has a concrete platform, supported on brick piers, where the rotary converter was located. The original location of the relay panel can be seen against the south wall, and the control and feeder panel against the east wall which supplied power to the feeder cables located either end at the top of the east wall. A toilet cubicle is located in the southeast corner of the space, over which an air compressor was once situated. An overhead gantry crane is still intact. A low exit door has been cut in the south wall, at a later date, and has an external timber access stair. The feeder cables were supported externally by large curved brackets on the east wall which remain intact with insulators. An AC transformer is located externally to the west.

On the western perimeter is a section of stone wall which was part of the gardens originally located on the site.

== Heritage listing ==
The Paddington Tramways Substation was listed on the Queensland Heritage Register on 22 March 1993 having satisfied the following criteria.

The place is important in demonstrating the evolution or pattern of Queensland's history.

The Paddington Substation is important in demonstrating part of the evolution and pattern of Queensland's history, in that it provides evidence of Brisbane's early 20th century tramway system and its contribution to the growth of the inner western suburbs; and has had a close association with the development of Brisbane's electricity supply system.

The place demonstrates rare, uncommon or endangered aspects of Queensland's cultural heritage.

In elements of the fabric and design, the building demonstrates now rare evidence of the electrical system arrangement and working of an interwar, rotary converter type, tramways substation in Brisbane.

The place is important in demonstrating the principal characteristics of a particular class of cultural places.

The substation is important in demonstrating the principal characteristics of a small scale industrial building designed for a prominent urban location.

The building has a special association with the work of tramways architect RR Ogg and chief engineer W Arundell.

The place is important because of its aesthetic significance.

The substation exhibits a landmark quality and contribution to the Brisbane townscape which is valued by the community.

The place has a strong or special association with a particular community or cultural group for social, cultural or spiritual reasons.

The building has strong social and cultural associations with the Paddington community, being an integral member of an historic group of sites on Cook's Hill which includes the former Ithaca Fire Station, the Ithaca War Memorial, and Ithaca Embankments.
