= Neal Macrossan Playground =

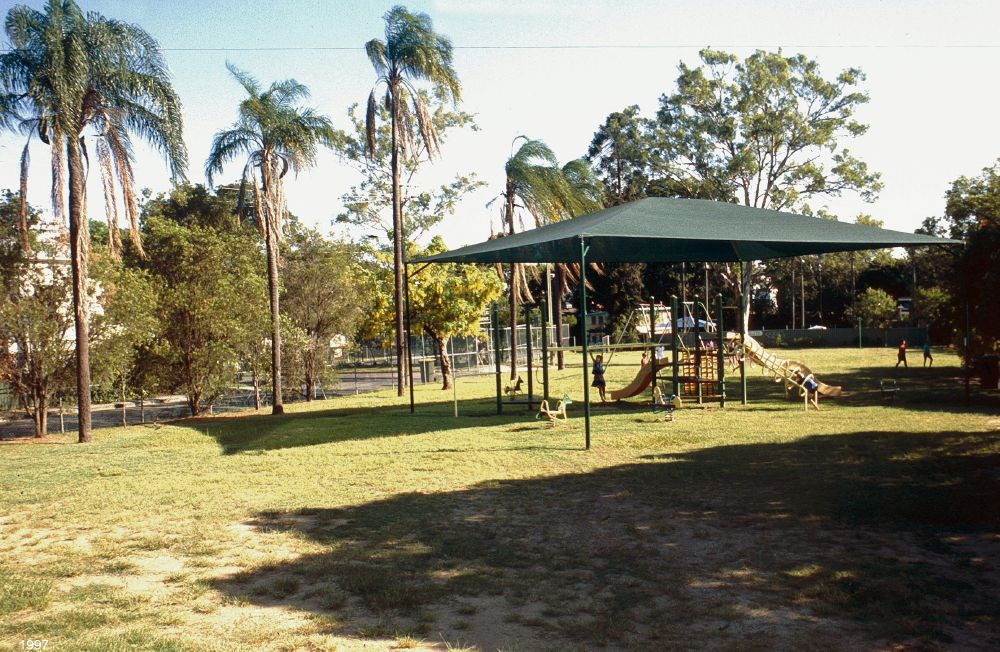
- Neal Macrossan Playground, 1997

- Location within Queensland Location within Australia
- 27.4623°S 153.0101°E
- Location: 14 Caroline Street, Paddington, Brisbane, Queensland, Australia

History
- Design period: 1914–1919 (World War I)
- Built: 1918–1934
- Built for: Playground Association of Queensland

Site notes
- Owner: Brisbane City Council

Queensland Heritage Register
- Official name: Neal Macrossan Playground, Ithaca Playground
- Type: state heritage (built, landscape)
- Designated: 9 May 1998
- Reference no.: 601787
- Significant period: 1910s–1920s (historical); 1910s–1930s (fabric); 1910s ongoing (social)
- Significant components: hall, trees/plantings, playground, library – building

Neal Macrossan Playground is a heritage-listed playground at 14 Caroline Street in the former suburb of Ithaca now Paddington, Brisbane, Queensland, Australia. It was built from 1918 to 1934. It is also known as Ithaca Playground. It was added to the Queensland Heritage Register on 9 May 1998.

== History ==
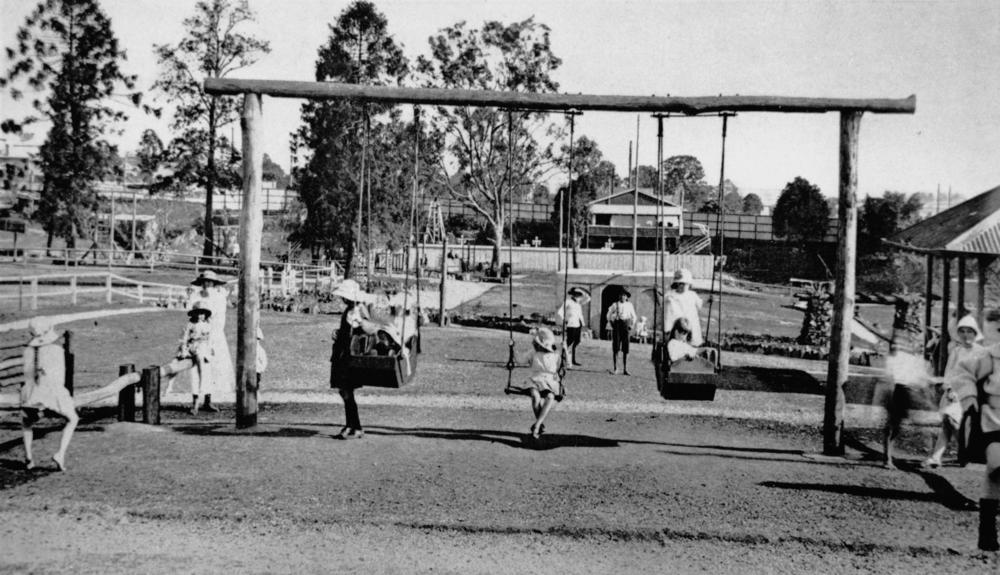
Playground, 1918

The Neal Macrossan Park, Paddington was designed as a model playground by the Playground Association in 1918. This was the first of the three early playgrounds organised by the Playground Association and was on the site of a former cemetery.

The Playground Association of Queensland held their first meeting in 1913 and was formed to introduce concepts emanating from the United States movement toward providing public recreation parks and playgrounds. A comprehensive guide to the design and management of these new parks, written by landscape architects and social planners, Arthur and Lorna Leland was published in 1909 and many of the themes of this book were adopted by the Playground Association of Queensland in their mission statements. In a time of serious epidemics the Leland book, Playground Technique and Playcraft, promoted a revised level of care and protection of children, allowing them a better chance at success in life. The basic requirements advocated for the mental and physical well being of children were good food, air, sunshine and exercise. Of these basic requirements, the playgrounds provided for three, and were also thought to instil a love of nature and an appreciation of beautiful environments. The first playgrounds in America developed as part of this movement were in Charlesbank, Boston; Boone Park, Louisville and many examples in Chicago all planned in the late nineteenth century. Many of these early playgrounds were designed by prolific and highly skilled landscape architect, Frederick Law Olmsted who was earlier involved with the highly influential design of Central Park, New York City. Generally these American playgrounds were incorporated in large public recreation parks, usually with elements such as playgrounds, open air gymnasiums, running tracks and field houses, which provided covered accommodation for halls, administrative offices, libraries and club rooms.

Unlike the large recreation parks constructed in the United States for the whole community, the playgrounds established in Queensland by the Playground Association were planned on a smaller scale, focussing solely on children and providing a playground and usually a field house. Usually the playgrounds were associated with an adjacent kindergarten or creche, and this is thought to have been due to Mary Josephine Bedford's involvement with the Creche and Kindergarten Association. This group formed in 1907 with the purpose of instituting and maintaining day nurseries and free kindergartens for the children of the poor in Brisbane. Like the Playground Association, the Creche and Kindergarten Association were successful in achieving local and Queensland Government sponsorship and funding as well as funding from various national philanthropic trust funds. The success of these two organisations can be rightly said to be due to the tireless and strategic work of Mary Josephine Bedford. Throughout her life Bedford, who is perhaps best remembered as the life long companion of Dr Lilian Violet Cooper, worked toward alleviating the stress and poverty afflicting urban dwellers. On her many study tours with Cooper, Bedford researched successful methods and programmes on the provision of family welfare in America and Europe and she is known to have attended lectures at Berkeley University on public recreation parks in about 1911, just two years before the Playground Association was established. Ms Bedford was associated with many of the early efforts in Brisbane to establish welfare; she was instrumental in increasing the scope of the Children's Hospital in 1905, she was involved with the establishment of the Queensland branch of the National Council of Women also in 1905; she and Cooper were delegates at the International Council of Women in Stockholm in 1912, and in 1916 both Bedford and Cooper served in Serbia during World War I, Bedford as an ambulance driver for which she received the 5th Order of St Sava. Ms Bedford remained an active participant of both the Creche and Kindergarten Association and the Playground Association until her death in December 1955. It is clearly through her extensive letter writing, evident in archival files on both organisations, that they achieved their successes.

The Playground Association in Queensland was formed with the practical intention of promoting the establishment of children's playgrounds and recreation centres in districts of poverty and high density. Also the Association worked towards assuming the administration of the parks and providing trained supervisors who were to direct play and, through this, to instil the values of courage, honesty and consideration in the children. The supervisors were also to look after the playground libraries, teach hand work and also to liaise with the children's homes. The Association was interested in the full social development of the child and saw the lessons learnt during play as an adjunct to the lessons the children studied in their classrooms.

The sites chosen for the three playgrounds managed by the Playground Association in their formative years were at:

- Paddington, established 1918
- East Street, Fortitude Valley, established 1922
- Spring Hill established 1927.

All three places of high-density low-cost housing. The characteristics of the sites were similar as well; the site was usually undeveloped and lying stagnant for various reasons; at Paddington the playground was part of a former cemetery and the Spring Hill playground was constructed on a former quarry site. The playgrounds were planned within a short distance of the local state school, usually near swimming baths and central to the density of housing surrounding the playground. They were planned with several mandatory features:

- a boundary fence to aid supervision and protection of the child
- borders within the playground separating girls, boys and toddlers
- a field house
- a well considered plan incorporating play equipment and open space.

The playgrounds were planned as model examples of recreational facilities for children, to be copied in both management and planning by schools and local councils across Queensland. Certainly the playgrounds established by the Playground Association foreshadowed a period of intense playground development in suburban Brisbane when a number were established by various groups, usually the city council or a local progress association. In 1938 a list was made of eight playgrounds managed or funded through the Brisbane City Council but not including those in which the Playground Association was involved. Like the three model playgrounds, the Brisbane City Council playgrounds were found in high density, inner city areas and included one in the Domain of the Brisbane Botanic Gardens. Over the next ten years the Council continued to acquire sites for playgrounds, although only those playgrounds managed by the Playground Association were supervised, a practice which continues to this day

The playground created in Paddington utilised the site of an early Brisbane cemetery which served the free settlers here from 1843 until 1875. The Paddington Cemeteries Act 1911 was passed to allow the land to be used for recreation purposes. The land on the southern side of Caxton Street became Lang Park and the land on the northern side was set aside as a reserve for the Ithaca Baths. On 13 June 1914 the remaining land on the northern side of Caxton Street was reserved for use as a children's playground. The original trusteeship lay with the Ithaca Shire Council, although the Brisbane City Council assumed the role on 15 April 1922. The land comprising the playground was twice increased in size; firstly in 1921 when the southern part of Moreton Street was closed and incorporated into the playground and secondly in 1934 when further land was adjacent to the first resumption was acquired for the playground. When the Inner North-West Ring Road (Hale Street ) development occurred in the early 1990s, further land, previously unallocated state land, was given to the playground.

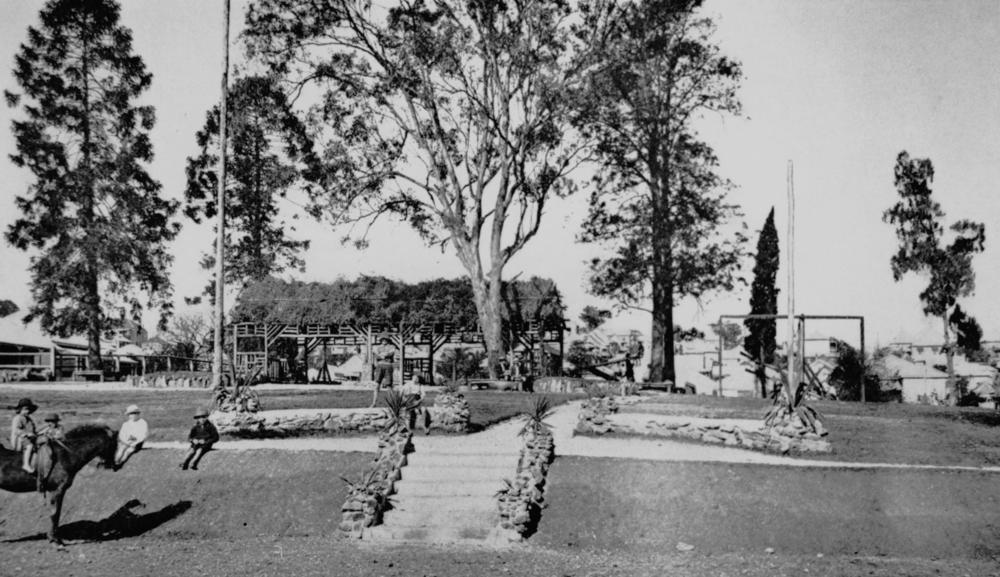
Playground, 1918

The Ithaca Playground, as the Neal Macrossan Playground was first known, was the first playground with which the Playground Association of Queensland was involved. The siting of the Ithaca Playground in the midst of a dense working class suburb on a previously disused publicly owned site reflects one of the fundamental aims of the Playground Association - to facilitate the full development of all children and to provide aid to those children who may not otherwise fulfil their potential. The designer of the Ithaca Playground is thought to have been Robert Black, an authorised surveyor and town engineer whose name appears on plans of the original planned site. The official catalogue of the Second Annual Town Planning Conference and Exhibition in 1918 included this plan which was titled, 'Plan of Children's Playground together with the Creche Kindergarten Free Library and Swimming Baths, Town of Ithaca' dated July 1918. It is interesting that the plan incorporates all of these elements which, though run by different organisations, were obviously components of a large public facility aimed at family welfare. The plan of the playground was not realised as fully as the drawing suggests. The proposed plan incorporated many elements formally laid out using axial lines, symmetry and focal points. Included on the lower terrace of the plan, allocated for boys' play was an oval for football, cricket and sports; a giant stride, open space, shelter shed with storage and an area for playing marbles and tops, appliances (equipment) for senior boys, appliance for junior boys; playing area for junior boys, a wading pool and a sand pit. The upper terrace, closer to the Creche and Kindergarten and allocated for the play of girls and infants, was a children's free library, appliances for senior girls, games area, appliances for junior girls, sand pit, concreted area for ball games, basketball court, central shelter, and appliances for kindergarten children with separate sand pit and wading pool. The plan suggests that these elements should all be divided, by garden beds, pathways and screens. The Ithaca Swimming Pool was at the southern end of the site near adjacent to the boys playing area. The land tapered toward the south, meaning supervisors housed in the administrative room provided in the free library would have all areas of the playground in view. The playground resulting from this planning was apparently less substantially built up, but the zoning and terracing was recognisable.

One of the key elements of the plan was the children's free library and supervisor's cottage which was constructed as a simple timber building with tiled pyramidal roof. The library was funded and built by Miss Marcella Rachel Clark on behalf of the Order of the Round Table. Construction of the building was supervised by town engineer, Robert Black and the building was officially opened by Lady Elsie Goold-Adams, the wife of the Queensland Governor Hamilton Goold-Adams, on 15 June 1917. This building which was originally on Moreton Street and known as a field house from the American models, was moved in about 1924, replaced by a large timber building housing the library, supervisor's cottage and a community hall. The original field house was moved to the east of the hall and remains in this place in 1998.

In 1959 the Brisbane City Council agreed to the suggestion of the Playground and Recreation Association to rename the park, the Neal Macrossan Playground in memory of Justice Neal Macrossan who had served about twenty years as the president of the Playground Association before his death in 1955. A locomotive was added to the playground on 20 March 1973 but this was removed in 1995. More recently the far south eastern corner of the site was dedicated as a skateboard/rollerblade facility and dedicated to Father Perry, a local Anglican minister who advocated strongly against the ring road. A naming ceremony was held on 25 September 1994.

== Description ==
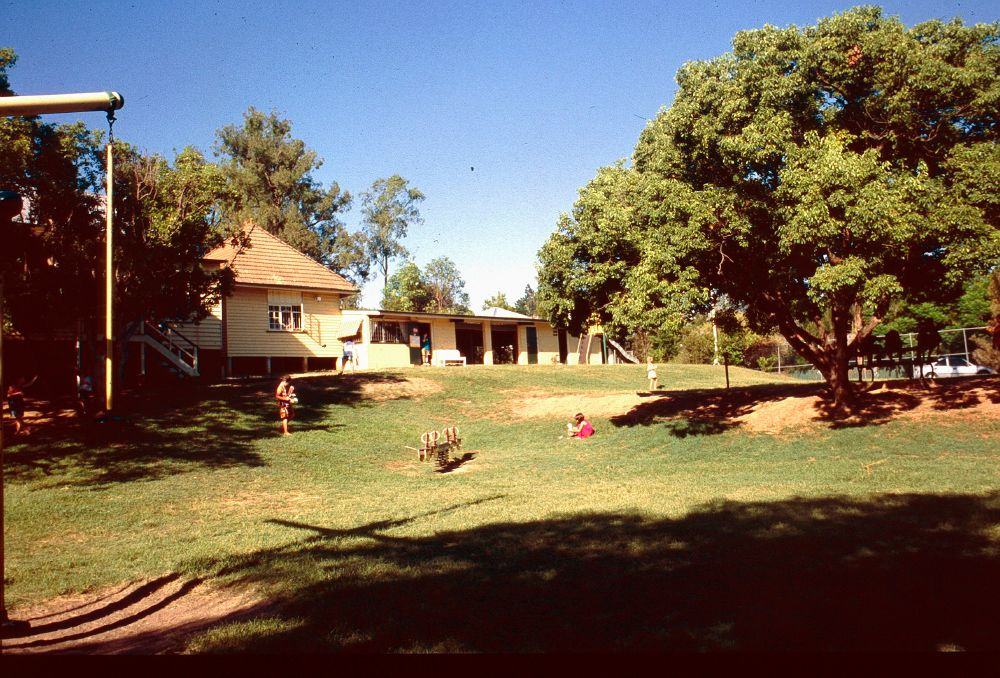
Playground, 1997

The Neal Macrossan Playground is an open space of inverted T-shape plan, bounded by Caxton Street to the south, Hale and Chrystal Streets to the east, Moreton Street to the west and the children's kindergarten and toy library to the north. The site comprises is bordered by large prominent fig trees along Caxton Street and on the Moreton Street boundary. Two large fig trees, thought to be part of the original scheme, are on the intersection of Moreton and Dowles Street. Centrally located along the Caxton Street boundary of the playground, but excluded from this listing, is the Ithaca Swimming Pool.

The playground comprises three buildings along the northern boundary, adjacent to the kindergarten; a tennis court in the north eastern along Caroline Street; a skate bowl, known as Father Perry Place on the eastern side of the swimming pool; a large oval on the western side of the swimming pool and terraced playground space in the central area. The three buildings at the Neal Macrossan Playground are a large public hall facing Moreton Street, a small former free library to the east of this, and abutting this on the eastern side is a covered play area.

The public hall is an elevated timber building with a gabled roof clad with corrugated iron. The building is clad externally with horizontal weatherboard. The western facade, facing the street, is lined with a verandah awning supported on simple stop chamfered columns. Between the columns is weatherboard panel balustrade which conceals timber stairs recessed in the verandah space. A large double timber boarded door, surrounded by lights and flanked by sash windows, is centrally located on this face of the building and provides access to a hall. The hall is lined on the southern side with an infilled verandah, and is lined internally with timber boarding and fibrous cement sheeting. At the front, eastern end of the hall is an elevated stage area, divided from the body of the hall by a timber arched proscenium.

The small square planned building on the eastern side of the hall, has a steeply pitched pyramidal roof clad with terracotta tiles. This is a simple elevated timber building with horizontal weatherboard external cladding and a large central window on the southern face. Abutting the east of this is a low set concrete block building constructed on a concrete slab and with a skillion roof clad with galvanised sheeting.

Neal Macrossan Playground is divided into sections by terracing of the land which falls away to the south. To the south of the buildings, which being at the northern end are on the highest ground, is the highest terrace. Below which are several terraced area, and a substantial embankment bordered the oval in the south western corner.

Established trees dominate the playground, particularly the aforementioned figs. Palms trees line the crystal street boundary, where the principal entrance to the playground is found through a chain link gate in a chain link fence. To the south of the buildings are several established shade trees. A tall hoop pine is planted at the eastern end of the playground, between the playground and the skate bowl.

== Heritage listing ==
Neal Macrossan Playground was listed on the Queensland Heritage Register on 9 May 1998 having satisfied the following criteria.

The place is important in demonstrating the evolution or pattern of Queensland's history.

The Neal Macrossan Playground which was established in 1918 is important in demonstrating the pattern of growth of the working class suburbs of inner city Brisbane, particularly Paddington. The playgrounds demonstrate early twentieth century philosophies of child care, particularly in relation to the importance of adequately providing for children in poorer communities to provide a better chance of their future success.

The place is important in demonstrating the principal characteristics of a particular class of cultural places.

The playground demonstrates the principal characteristics of early playgrounds formed by the Playground Association of Queensland, influenced by similar American models and designed as the model for all Queensland playgrounds. This is particularly evident in the siting, early land formation, early hall and established plantings.

The place is important because of its aesthetic significance.

The site has aesthetic significance as a public open space with established plantings forming a substantial element of the Paddington townscape, in particular the large Moreton Bay fig trees which line Caxton Street and Moreton Street are significant landmark elements. The hall is a well composed building which contributes markedly to the streetscape.

The place has a strong or special association with a particular community or cultural group for social, cultural or spiritual reasons.

The playground has special associations with the surrounding community as well known public recreation reserve and supervised children's playground.

The place has a special association with the life or work of a particular person, group or organisation of importance in Queensland's history.

Neal Macrossan Playground has a special association with Ms Mary Josephine Bedford, an early Brisbane philanthropist who successfully instigated elements of family welfare in working class suburbs of Brisbane through her involvement with both the Playground Association and the Creche and Kindergarten Association. This was the first playground planned by the Playground Association and has importance to this group which continues its supervision to this day. The playground was named for Justice Neal Macrossan who was a long time president of the Playground Association and has special associations with him.
