= Ithaca War Memorial =

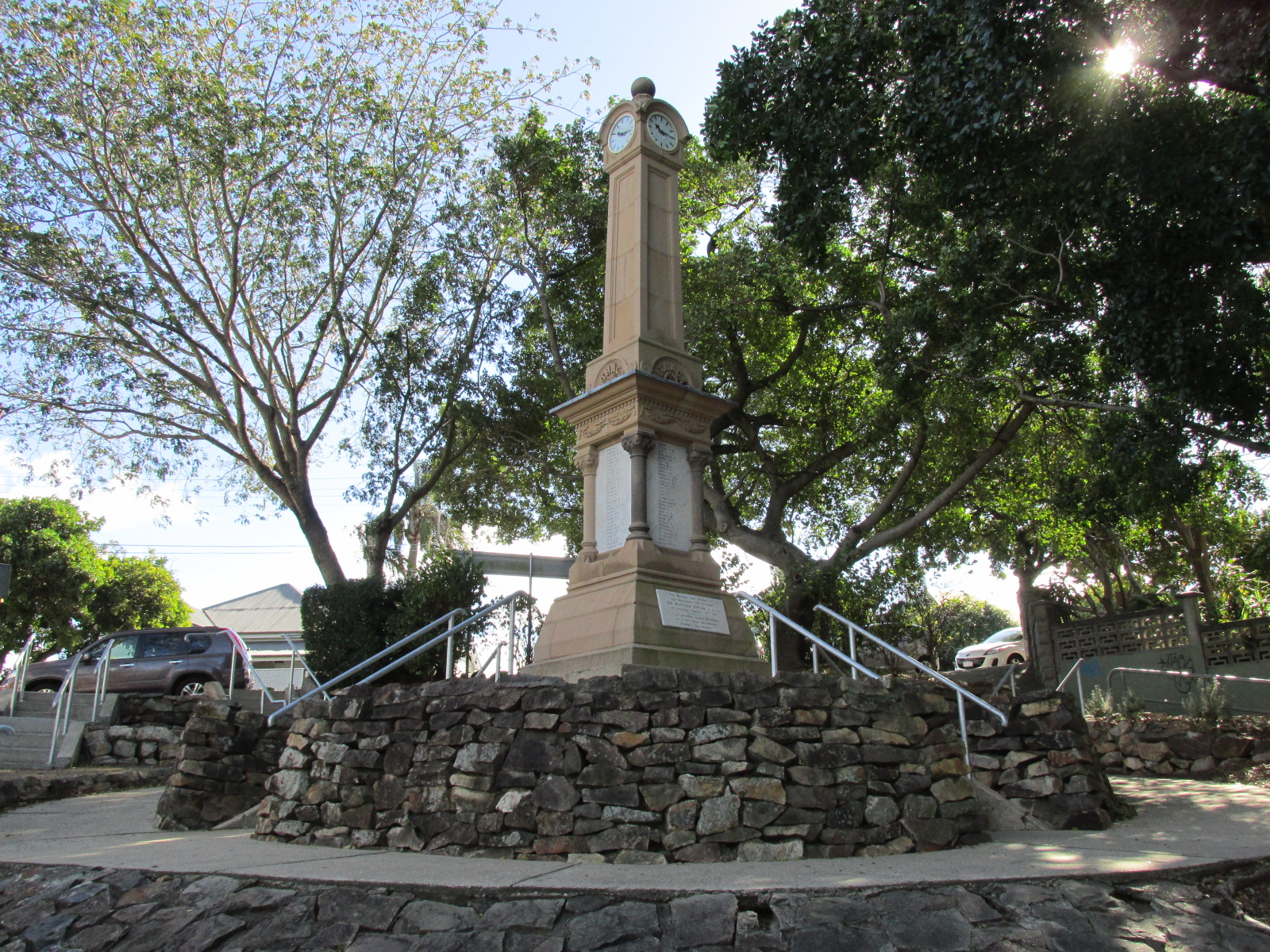
- Ithaca War Memorial, 2014

- Location within Queensland Location within Australia
- 27.4585°S 153.0006°E
- Location: Enoggera Terrace, Paddington, Queensland, Australia

History
- Design period: 1919–1930s (interwar period)
- Built: 1921–1925
- Built for: Town of Ithaca

Site notes
- Architect(s): Arthur Henry Thurlow, Alexander Jolly
- Owner: Brisbane City Council

Queensland Heritage Register
- Official name: Ithaca War Memorial and Park, Alexander Jolly Park
- Type: state heritage (built, landscape)
- Designated: 21 October 1992
- Reference no.: 600274
- Significant period: 1921– (social); 1921–1925
- Significant components: garden – bed/s, clock, trees/plantings, memorial – clock tower, pathway/walkway, wall/s – retaining
- Builders: Arthur Henry Thurlow, Alexander Jolly

Ithaca War Memorial and Park is a heritage-listed memorial and park at Enoggera Terrace, Paddington, Queensland, Australia. The memorial was designed and built by Arthur Henry Thurlow between 1921 and 1925. The park was built and designed by Alexander Jolly. It is also known as Alexander Jolly Park. It was added to the Queensland Heritage Register on 21 October 1992.

== History ==
The Ithaca War Memorial and Park was created c.1922 by a committee on behalf of the citizens of the Town of Ithaca. The monument was designed and executed by Brisbane monumental masonry firm Arthur Henry Thurlow, under the supervision of R Black, the Ithaca town engineer. The park was laid out by Ithaca Town Council landscape gardener, Alexander Jolly.

=== The monument ===
The Ithaca Town Council first considered the creation of a memorial to the fallen as early as October 1915. In February 1916, the mayor W. R. Warmington unveiled an honour board listing the names of those from Ithaca who had volunteered for war service. Although unveiled at the Picture Palace in Enoggera Terrace, Red Hill, the intention was that the honour board would be permanently located in the Ithaca Town Council Chambers. At the time of its unveiling, the honour board contained over 400 names (of an estimated 700) as the council was dependent on relatives and friends sending in the names of those serving. By January 1917, the honour board was housed in the Council Chambers and had over 600 names. However, by later that year, there was a strong desire to have a more public acknowledgement of those served. In October 1917, there was a proposal by the Ithaca Parks Committee to plant an avenue of trees from Milton Road to Nash Street, while in November 1917 a meeting of citizens formed a committee to come up with a public memorial proposal. However, plans were abandoned in January 1918 when the Queensland Government's War Committee would not issue a permit to collect funds for the war memorials while war needs still went unmet.

However, after the Armistice on 11 November 1918, the desire for a memorial to the Ithaca fallen resurfaced. A week after the Armistice, the Town Council again considered planting trees with each one to individually commemorate a resident who had died in military service. However, by late 1919, funds were being raised for the memorial with the Ithaca Town Council committing to contribute 20% of the funds raised by residents, but the precise form of the memorial was yet to be determined despite numerous public meetings. Fundraising via donations, fetes, concerts and other activities continued until in June 1921 the Council decided that the funds (by then £650) were sufficient to consider designs of the memorial. The Returned Sailors and Soldiers Imperial League of Australia proposed a memorial hall, suggesting it would be of greater community benefit than a monument, but the town council was concerned about ongoing maintenance costs of a hall. In July 1921, a decision had been made to commission a monument which would be located on Cook's Hill and would have the names of the fallen engraved upon it.

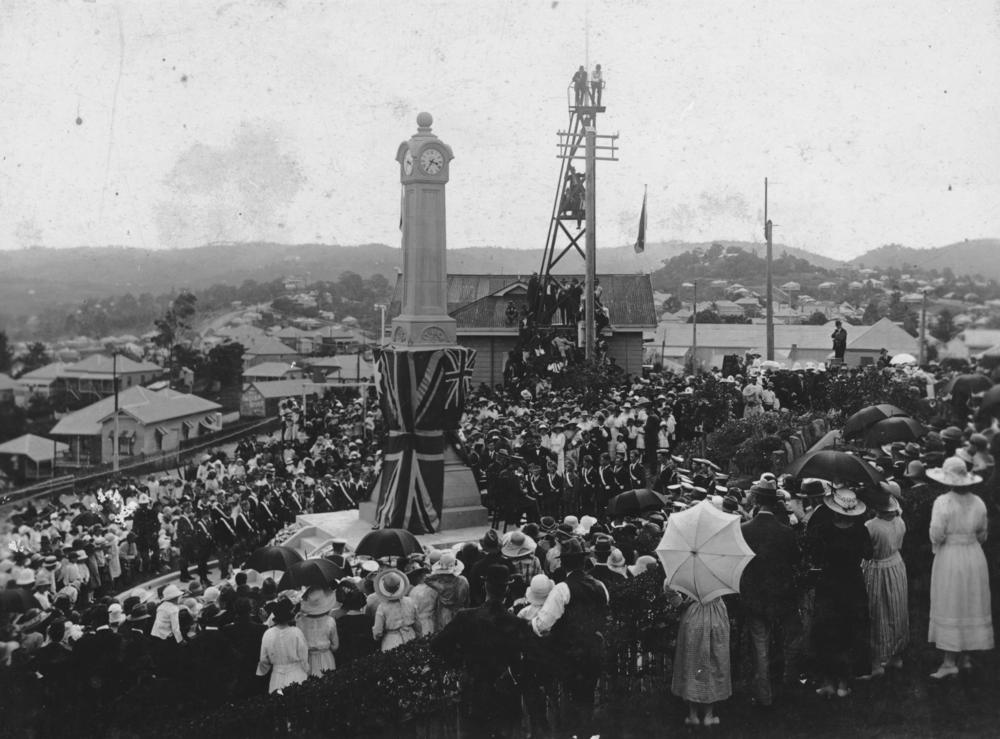
Unveiling of the Ithaca War Memorial, 1922

The Ithaca War Memorial was finally unveiled on 25 February 1922 by Sir Matthew Nathan, Governor of Queensland. The final cost of £650 was raised by the local community. The stone memorial honours the 130 local men who died on active service during the First World War.

There were many different types of war memorials erected in Queensland, however, clock towers were comparatively rare. The memorial at Ithaca is the earliest of this type of memorial, and is the only one of its type in Brisbane. The clock was manufactured by the well-known Synchronome Electric Company of Brisbane, initially driven by a master clock in the adjacent Ithaca Fire Station.

=== The park ===
The park is situated on a parcel of land sandwiched between Enoggera and Latrobe Terraces on Cooks Hill. It was, and remains crown land designated for road purposes, but by 1922 the cutting along Latrobe Terrace negated future road use. The road survives only in the asphalted walkway beside the park, linking Enoggera and Latrobe Terraces.

In the first decade of the 20th century, Ithaca experienced a housing and population boom largely attributable to the expansion of the tramways through the area. Subsequently, in the 1910s the Ithaca Town Council embarked on a programme of civic improvements which included the formation and metalling of roads; tree planting; and the establishment of numerous embankment gardens, small reserves and street gardens.

Because of the hilly terrain, many of the new streets were divided, leaving embankments which the Ithaca Town Council considered were cheaper to plant and beautify than to cut down. This innovation in Brisbane civic landscaping led to the Council receiving numerous requests from other councils, interstate as well as Queensland, for photographs and plans of Ithaca street improvements. The War Memorial Park is one of the few areas from this period to have survived. Only small sections of the Waterworks Road rockeries remain, and most of the Cook's Hill garden was destroyed when the Paddington Tramways Substation was erected in 1929–30.

At the time of unveiling the hill top on which the memorial is located was bare, permitting the memorial to be a dominant landmark. Now that trees have become established, the landmark qualities of the memorial itself have diminished somewhat. However, the setting and location still forms a landmark within the streetscape.

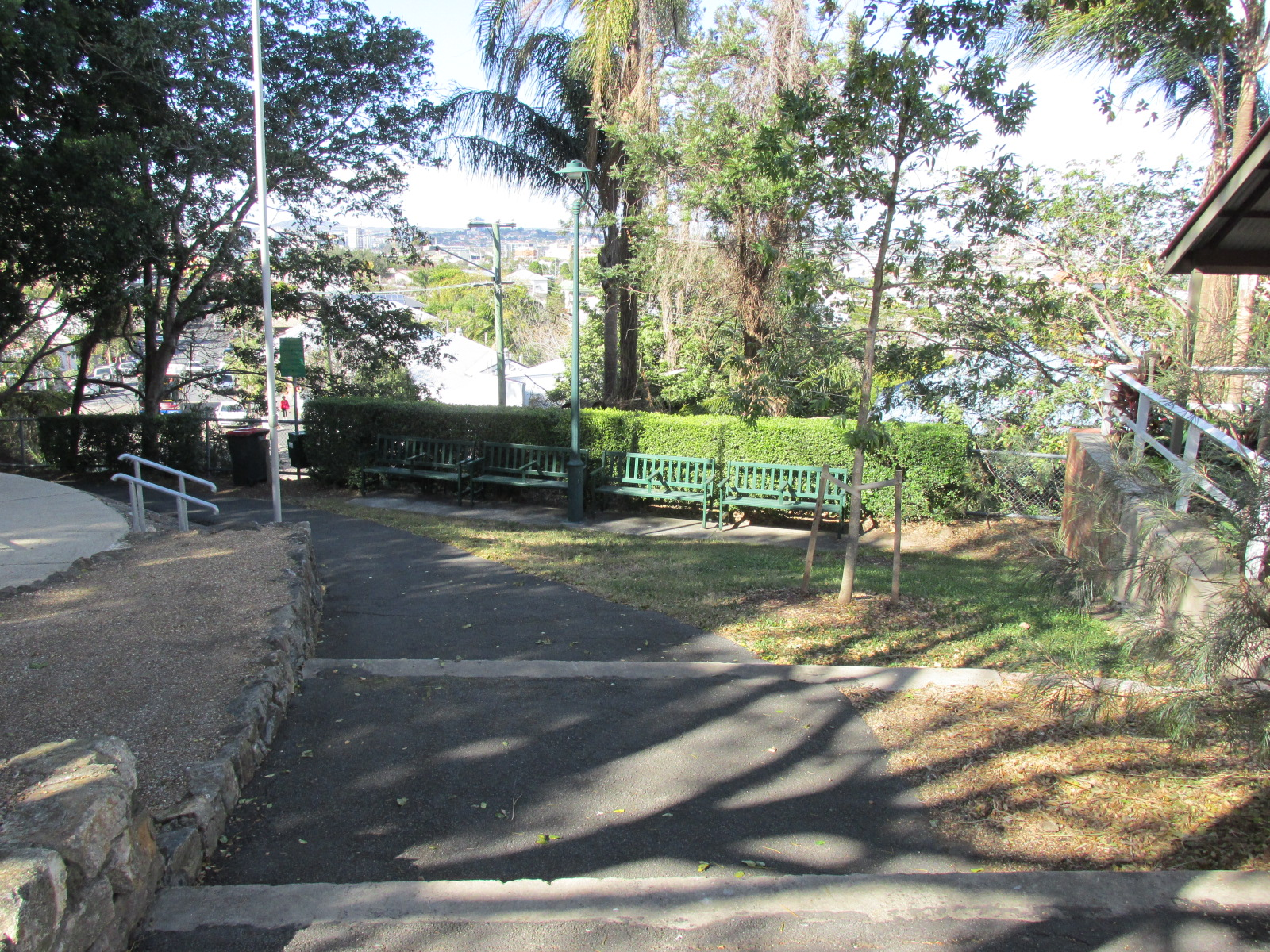
Landscaping, 2014

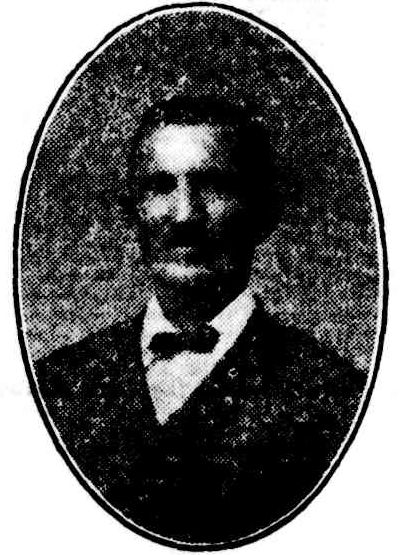
Alexander Jolly

The landscaping of the park was carried out by Alexander Jolly, Ithaca Town Council landscape gardener (and father of the first Mayor of Greater Brisbane, William Jolly). Son of a Scottish farmer, and a horticultural enthusiast, Jolly had arrived in Brisbane in 1879, aged 22 years. He was head gardener on Alexander Stewart's Glen Lyon estate at Ashgrove for at least seven years before he went to work for the Ithaca Town Council.

Jolly was a self-educated man, whose lifetime of gardening experience transformed the Ithaca townscape in the period c.1915–25. Other landscaping works by Jolly included the rockeries along Musgrave and Waterworks Roads and the landscaping of Cook's Hill. After his death in March 1925, the memorial park was renamed the Alexander Jolly Park, "in memory of one of the most esteemed men in the district", and as a "unique tribute . . . to the pick and shovel".

The Alexander Jolly Park, now known as Ithaca Memorial Park, has been maintained by the Brisbane City Council since 1925.

=== Significance of war memorials in Australia ===
Australia, and Queensland in particular, had few civic monuments before the First World War. The memorials erected in its wake became our first national monuments, recording the devastating impact of the war on a young nation. Australia lost 60,000 from a population of about 4 million, representing one in five of those who served. No previous or subsequent war has made such an impact on the nation.

Even before the end of the war, memorials became a spontaneous and highly visible expression of national grief. To those who erected them, they were as sacred as grave sites, substitute graves for the Australians whose bodies lay in battlefield cemeteries in Europe and the Middle East. British policy decreed that the Empire war dead were to be buried where they fell. The word "cenotaph", commonly applied to war memorials at the time, literally means "empty tomb".

Australian war memorials are distinctive in that they commemorate not only the dead. Australians were proud that their first great national army, unlike other belligerent armies, was composed entirely of volunteers, men worthy of honour whether or not they made the supreme sacrifice. Many memorials honour all who served from a locality, not just the dead, providing valuable evidence of community involvement in the war. Such evidence is not readily obtainable from military records, or from state or national listings, where names are categorised alphabetically or by military unit.

Australian war memorials are also valuable evidence of imperial and national loyalties, at the time, not seen as conflicting; the skills of local stonemasons, metalworkers and architects; and of popular taste. In Queensland, the soldier statue was the popular choice of memorial, whereas the obelisk predominated in the southern states, possibly a reflection of Queensland's larger working-class population and a lesser involvement of architects.

Many of the First World War monuments have been updated to record local involvement in later conflicts, and some have fallen victim to unsympathetic re-location and repair.

== Description ==
Ithaca Memorial Park is located on a south sloping site on the side of a ridge, fronting Enoggera Terrace to the north and with a steep embankment to Latrobe Terrace below to the south. A bitumen path leads down at the eastern side boundary to Latrobe Terrace below. Another asphalt path, at a lesser gradient, sweeps up around the southwestern side of the memorial to Enoggera Terrace. The site includes two mature ficus trees on the western side and a planted embankment down to Latrobe Terrace.

The First World War Memorial comprises a pedestal and column surmounted by a clock with a face on all four sides. It sits on a square concrete platform and is surrounded by dry stone retaining walls and a concrete path. Steps lead to the memorial from each of the four sides forming a cross in plan, with the overall geometry softened by planting, retaining walls and the steep slope of the site.

The sandstone memorial sits on a smooth faced base step which is surmounted by a larger step of sandstone blocks with tapered sides. On the front face of this is a marble plaque. The pedestal comprises a recessed square pillar with engaged columns at each corner. Each face bears a recessed marble plate with the leaded names of the 130 men who died. The columns have Composite order capitals and bases and support a large entablature. The frieze has relief carved festoons on each face and has a small dentil course under the cornice which is composed of cyma recta and cyma reversa mouldings.

The entablature is surmounted by a square pillar on a slightly larger square base. Each face bears a semi circular recess with the word "Ithaca" carved in relief and pateras on each side. Above this is the pillar itself. Each face has a recessed panel with moulding and on the side facing Enoggera Terrace are two relief carved flags with the inscription "Honour the Brave" below. The pillar is surmounted by the clock which comprises a clock face on each side with hood moulds over each face. The top of the memorial is rounded and crowned by a sandstone sphere.

== Heritage listing ==
Ithaca War Memorial and Park was listed on the Queensland Heritage Register on 21 October 1992 having satisfied the following criteria.

The place is important in demonstrating the evolution or pattern of Queensland's history.

War Memorials are important in demonstrating the pattern of Queensland's history as they are representative of a recurrent theme that involved most communities throughout the state. They provide evidence of an era of widespread Australian patriotism and nationalism, particularly during and following the First World War.

The place demonstrates rare, uncommon or endangered aspects of Queensland's cultural heritage.

It is rare as the earliest example of the clock tower type of memorial.

The place is important in demonstrating the principal characteristics of a particular class of cultural places.

The monuments manifest a unique documentary record and are demonstrative of popular taste in the inter-war period.

Erected c. 1922, the memorial at Ithaca demonstrates the principal characteristics of a commemorative structure erected as an enduring record of a major historical event. This is achieved through the use of appropriate materials and design elements.

The place is important because of its aesthetic significance.

The aesthetic qualities and landmark value of the memorial in its purpose-designed setting contributes to the Paddington townscape.

The place has a strong or special association with a particular community or cultural group for social, cultural or spiritual reasons.

It has a strong and continuing association with the community as evidence of the impact of a major historic event and as a focal point for remembrance of that event. The park also has special associations with landscape gardener Alexander Jolly as one of the few remaining examples of his work, and with monumental masonry firm A H Thurlow.
