= Killarney, Enoggera =

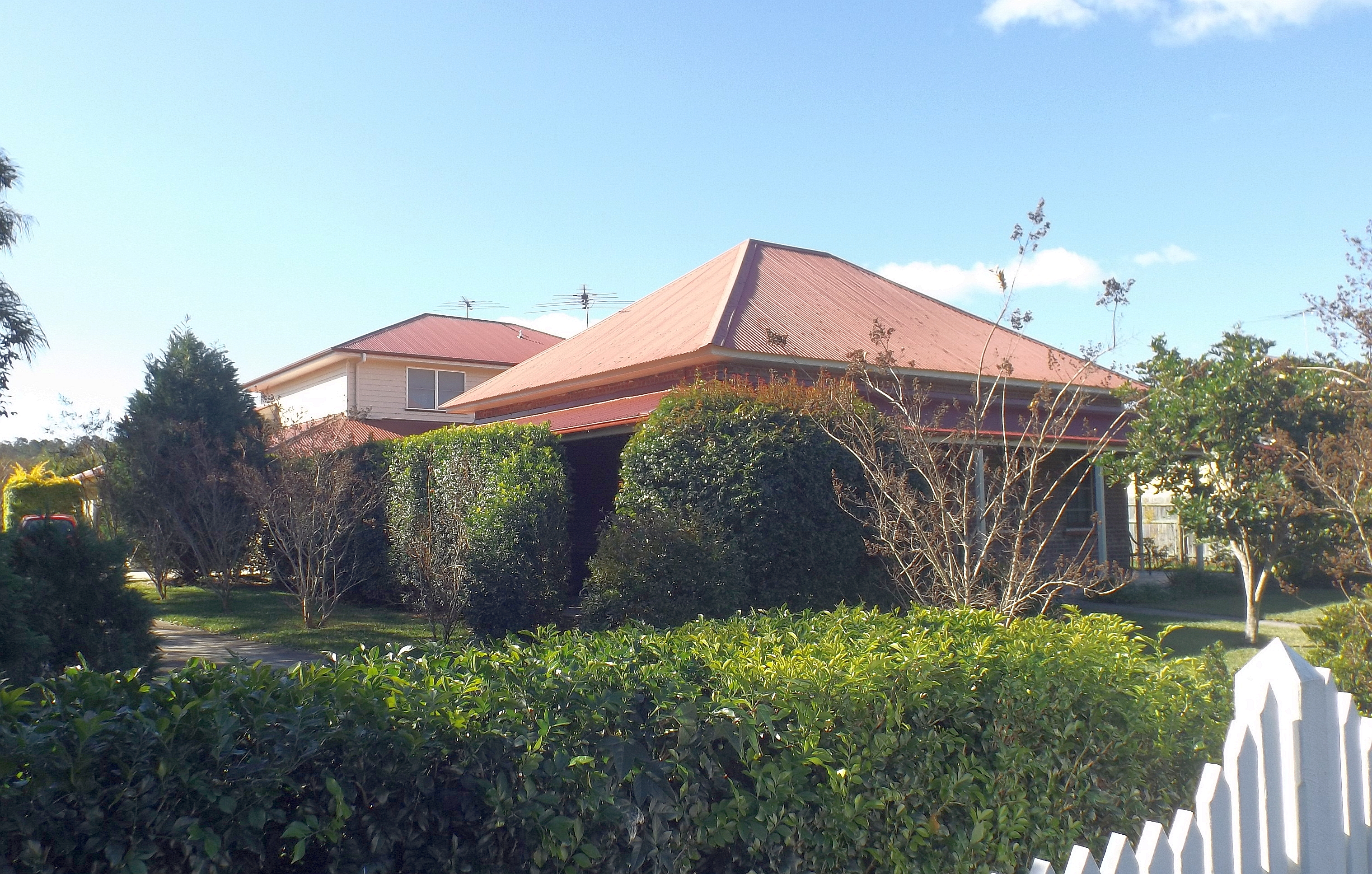
- Residence in 2015

- Location within Queensland Location within Australia
- 27.4167°S 152.9975°E
- Location: 9 Laurel Street, Enoggera, City of Brisbane, Queensland, Australia

History
- Design period: 1840s–1860s (mid-19th century)
- Built: c. 1860

Queensland Heritage Register
- Official name: Killarney
- Type: state heritage (built)
- Designated: 21 October 1992
- Reference no.: 600194
- Significant period: 1860s (fabric); 1860s–1890s (historical)
- Significant components: tank – water (underground), residential accommodation – main house, garden/grounds

Killarney is a heritage-listed detached house at 9 Laurel Street, Enoggera, City of Brisbane, Queensland, Australia. It was built c. 1860s. It was added to the Queensland Heritage Register on 21 October 1992.

== History ==
Killarney is thought to have been erected in the 1860s for Timothy Corbett – a Brisbane property owner and Kedron Brook farmer. It is one of the earliest surviving residences in the Kedron Brook district and, for Queensland, of rare early brick construction.

Timothy Corbett was an Irish Catholic immigrant and patriot, and a very early Moreton Bay settler, having arrived here in the early 1840s, possibly even before the penal settlement was declared open to free settlement in February 1842. He was involved in various Brisbane business enterprises, and from 1850 was included on the Brisbane jury lists.

In October 1851 Corbett purchased approximately 30 acres (12 ha) (portion 4, parish of Enoggera) of Crown land along Kedron Brook for the sum of £30, and in March 1852 purchased the adjoining 35 acres (14 ha) (portion 5, parish of Enoggera) for £35. The land had been surveyed in June 1849 and offered at public auction in November 1849, but did not sell at the time. These blocks were covered with Oak Brush and Tea Tree flat, and passing through them was a Proven road from Brisbane – the original line of the South Pine Road (Survey Plan M.1118.20).

From the 1860s, the Kedron Brook district was well known for its mixed farming, vineyards and orchards, and as the gateway to the farming and timber centres of Samford and South Pine. Reputedly, the first Governor of Queensland, Sir George Bowen, and Lady Bowen were frequent visitors to the Surrenden vineyard on Kedron Brook in the early 1860s.

It is not clear when Corbett started to farm his Kedron Brook land, nor when he moved there. In government land sales registers he is recorded in August 1853 and again in December 1857 (when he bought a farm block on the river at St Lucia) as being resident in Brisbane. He married Alice Finn in Brisbane in 1856 and their first three children were all Brisbane births. In 1864–1865, Corbett was in partnership with George Edmondstone in the construction of Queen Street buildings designed by architect William Henry Ellerker. Whether Ellerker, who left Queensland in late 1866, was associated also with the design of Killarney, has yet to be established.

It is likely that the Corbetts moved to Kedron Brook in the 1860s, and probably were resident there by mid-1871, when T Corbett, Church of Rome, was elected by the local community as a school patron. Corbett and his neighbour James Mooney each gave part of their land fronting South Pine Road, (on portions 5 and 6 respectively), for the establishment of the Enoggera Primary School, which opened in September 1871. The Corbetts were among the earliest settlers along Kedron Brook and were well known in the district, their property being the venue for many community gatherings. Other early settlers included the Lade, Mott, Robinson, Dunlop, and McDowall families.

The district remained an isolated farming community until the extension of the now Ferny Grove railway line from the Newmarket sale yards to Enoggera railway station, which opened for traffic on 4 February 1889. After this the Kedron Brook district slowly acquired a suburban character, and by the 1920s was divided into a number of smaller, closely settled suburbs: Alderley, Enoggera, Gaythorne, and Groveley. By the 1930s, the district also had an industrial focus, with sawmills, potteries, and brickworks.

Following Timothy Corbett's death at his Enoggera residence on 30 March 1887, Killarney passed to his eldest son Edward Joseph Corbett, a solicitor who had developed a successful law practice in Brisbane and chairman of the Enoggera Divisional Board. Timothy's widow, Alice, was bequeathed the use of the house for as long as she wished to continue residence there. In 1889 EJ Corbett married Cecelia Mary Beirne, and the couple continued to reside at Killarney, with Alice Corbett, until Edward's death on 19 July 1893 at the early age of 32 when his horse bolted. Killarney then passed to his widow Cecelia and to his brother William Francis Corbett, of Hamilton, as administrators. Although the Corbett family retained the property until the 1910s, Killarney appears to have become a rental property by 1895.

In 1912, title to the Corbett farm, including the residence, was transferred to David Rhoades, who subdivided the land into residential allotments as the Derby Estate. By 1931, the estate was thickly settled. In 1925 title to Killarney and its remaining 62 perches (1,600 m^{2}) passed to the Tate family, then in 1934 to Emily Firrell. Killarney passed to Mrs. Firrell's daughter, Beryl Agnes Farry, in 1948, and it remains her property. After her death, it was purchased by Dr. John and Mrs Sabina Rui in 2004. They completed extensive renovations, under the guidance of the heritage council, which included: stripping back all doors, floors and windows to original wood; adding a large extension (connected to the sunroom) that retained some of the original bricks from the old kitchen; adding a swimming pool; and building an underground water tank (separate from the heritage-listed well). They sold in 2017 for what was then a record amount for the suburb.

== Description ==
Killarney was originally a four-roomed single-storeyed house surrounded by a verandah, with a detached kitchen at the rear. It was built of hand-made bricks, with a short ridge roof of corrugated iron. The front windows are six-paned double-hung sashes. French doors open to the side verandahs which have broad timber posts. The internal brick walls are lined with lime plaster, while the ceilings are cedar boards.

The interior has been modified by the sheeting of the walls and ceilings. A modern kitchen has been incorporated in the house and a bathroom added on the back verandah. The original kitchen was demolished in 1975 and replaced with a four-roomed wing joined to the house by an enclosed verandah. The bricks from the kitchen were reused in the new structure.

An early underground water tank is located in the back yard.

== Heritage listing ==
Killarney was listed on the Queensland Heritage Register on 21 October 1992 having satisfied the following criteria.

The place is important in demonstrating the evolution or pattern of Queensland's history.

Killarney, erected c. 1860s, is important for its association with the early settlement of Kedron Brook/Enoggera as a farming district.

The place demonstrates rare, uncommon or endangered aspects of Queensland's cultural heritage.

The house is one of comparatively few surviving, mid-19th century Brisbane residences, and is one of the oldest remaining houses in the Kedron Brook district. It is a rare surviving example of a mid-19th century brick house in Queensland, and has potential to reveal more about Brisbane's early brickmaking history and technology.

The place has potential to yield information that will contribute to an understanding of Queensland's history.

It is a rare surviving example of a mid-19th century brick house in Queensland, and has potential to reveal more about Brisbane's early brickmaking history and technology.

The place is important in demonstrating the principal characteristics of a particular class of cultural places.

It is a rare surviving example of a mid-19th century brick house in Queensland, and has potential to reveal more about Brisbane's early brickmaking history and technology.

The place is important because of its aesthetic significance.

It has aesthetic value, particularly in the rustic materials and simple design.

The place has a special association with the life or work of a particular person, group or organisation of importance in Queensland's history.

The place has a strong association with the life and work of Timothy Corbett and his family, Corbett being amongst the earliest free settlers following the closure of the Moreton Bay penal colony in 1842.
