= Ithaca Division =

Local government area of Queensland, Australia

Coordinates: 27.4553°S 153.0054°E

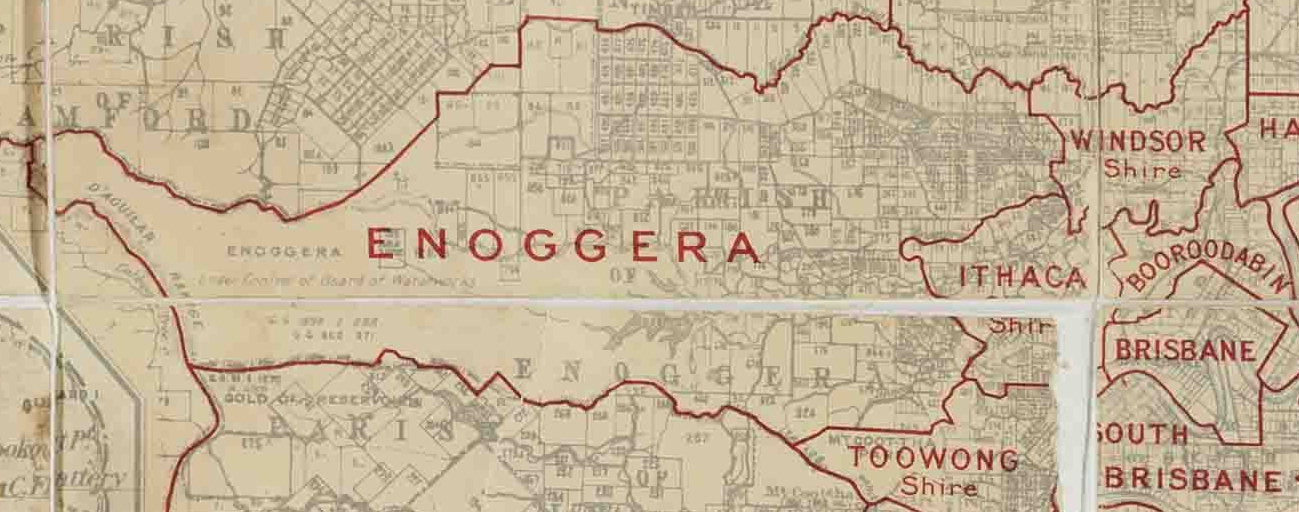
The original Ithaca Division comprised all of the Enoggera Division, Shire of Ithaca and Shire of Windsor as seen on this March 1902 map

The Ithaca Division is a former local government area of Queensland, Australia, located in north-western Brisbane.

== History ==
The Ithaca Division was one of the original divisions created on 11 November 1879 under the Divisional Boards Act of 1879 with a population of 3369. It comprised 3 subdivisions.

By 1886, the residents of subdivision 1 were petitioning to separate and become the Shire of Windsor, resulting in the establishment of the Shire of Windsor on 11 Feb 1887.

Meanwhile, the residents of subdivision 2 were petitioning to separate and become the Shire of Ithaca, resulting in the creation of the Shire of Ithaca on 18 Aug 1887.

The now much depleted Ithaca Division then requested to be renamed the Enoggera Division and this occurred on 28 Mar 1888.

The Local Authorities Act 1902 replaced divisions with shires and towns. As a result, on 31 Mar 1903, the Enoggera Division became the Shire of Enoggera.

On 1 October 1925, the shire was amalgamated into the current City of Brisbane, together with all the areas that had been previously separated from it.
