= Shire of Enoggera =

Former local government area in Queensland, Australia

Coordinates: 27.429°S 152.909°E

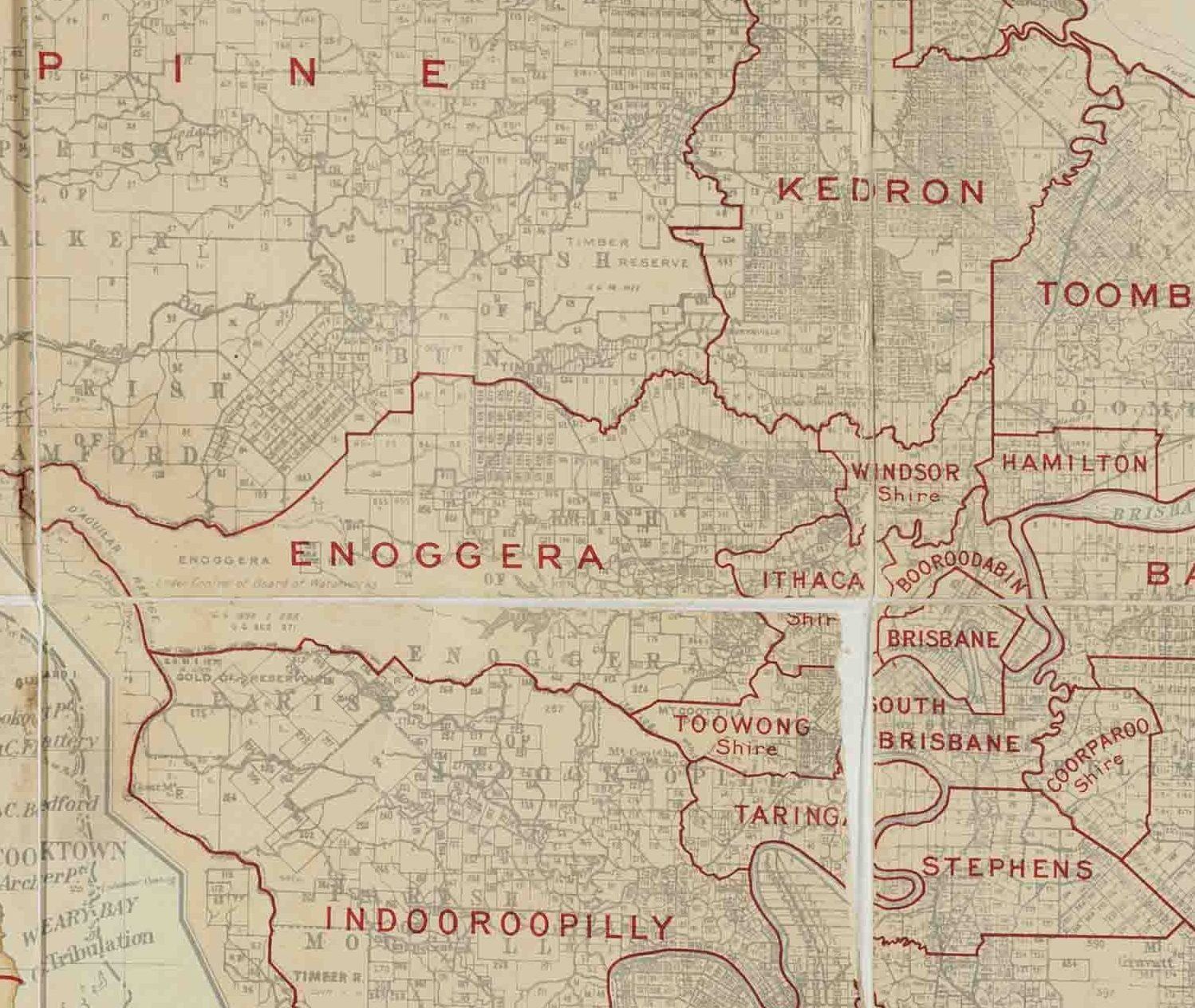
Map of Enoggera Division and adjacent local government areas, March 1902

The Shire of Enoggera is a former local government area of Queensland, Australia, located in north-western Brisbane.

== History ==
Ithaca Division was one of the original divisions created on 11 November 1879 under the Divisional Boards Act 1879. It comprised 3 subdivisions. By 1886, the residents of subdivision 1 were petitioning to separate and become the Shire of Windsor, resulting in the establishment of the Shire of Windsor on 11 February 1887. Meanwhile, the residents of subdivision 2 were petitioning to separate and become the Shire of Ithaca, resulting in the creation of the Shire of Ithaca on 18 August 1887.

The now much-depleted Ithaca Division then requested to be renamed the Enoggera Division and this occurred on 28 March 1888.

The Local Authorities Act 1902 replaced divisions with shires and towns. As a result, on 31 March 1903, the Enoggera Division became the Shire of Enoggera.

On 1 October 1925, the shire was amalgamated into the City of Brisbane.

== Chairmen ==
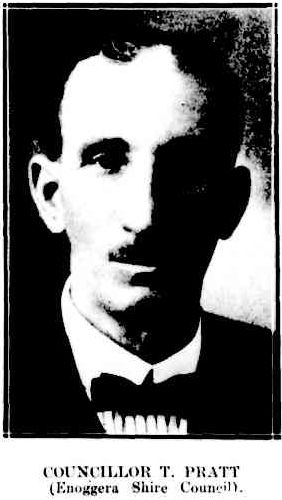
Thomas Pratt, Chairman Enoggera Shire Council, 1924

The chairmen of the division and shire were:

- 1880–1882: John Lloyd Bale
- 1883–1885: John Guthrie
- 1886–1887: Jesse Paten
- 1888: William McCallum Park
- 1889–1890: John Scott Mullin
- 1891: William Peter Gordon
- 1892: Edward Joseph Corbett of Killarney
- 1893: Jesse Paten
- 1894–95: Charles Henry Chamberlain
- 1896–98: James Fred Cole
- 1899: Thomas Marshall senior
- 1900: James Fred Cole, then Jesse Paten
- 1901: John Francis Bergin
- 1902: John Tate
- 1903: David Lanham, later Thomas Robinson
- 1904: David Lanham
- 1905: James Fred Cole
- 1906: Alfred Pickering
- 1907: David Lanham
- 1908: John Tate
- 1909 Mr Marshall junior
- 1910: John Francis Bergin
- 1911: William Harwood Ashton
- 1912: George Oakden
- 1913: John Francis Bergin
- 1914: James Fred Cole
- 1915: Alfred Pickering
- 1916: Henry Willmington
- 1917: Henry Hilder
- 1918: Walter Woodcock
- 1919: James Fred Cole
- 1920–24: Thomas Pratt
