= Glen Lyon, Ashgrove =

Glen Lyon
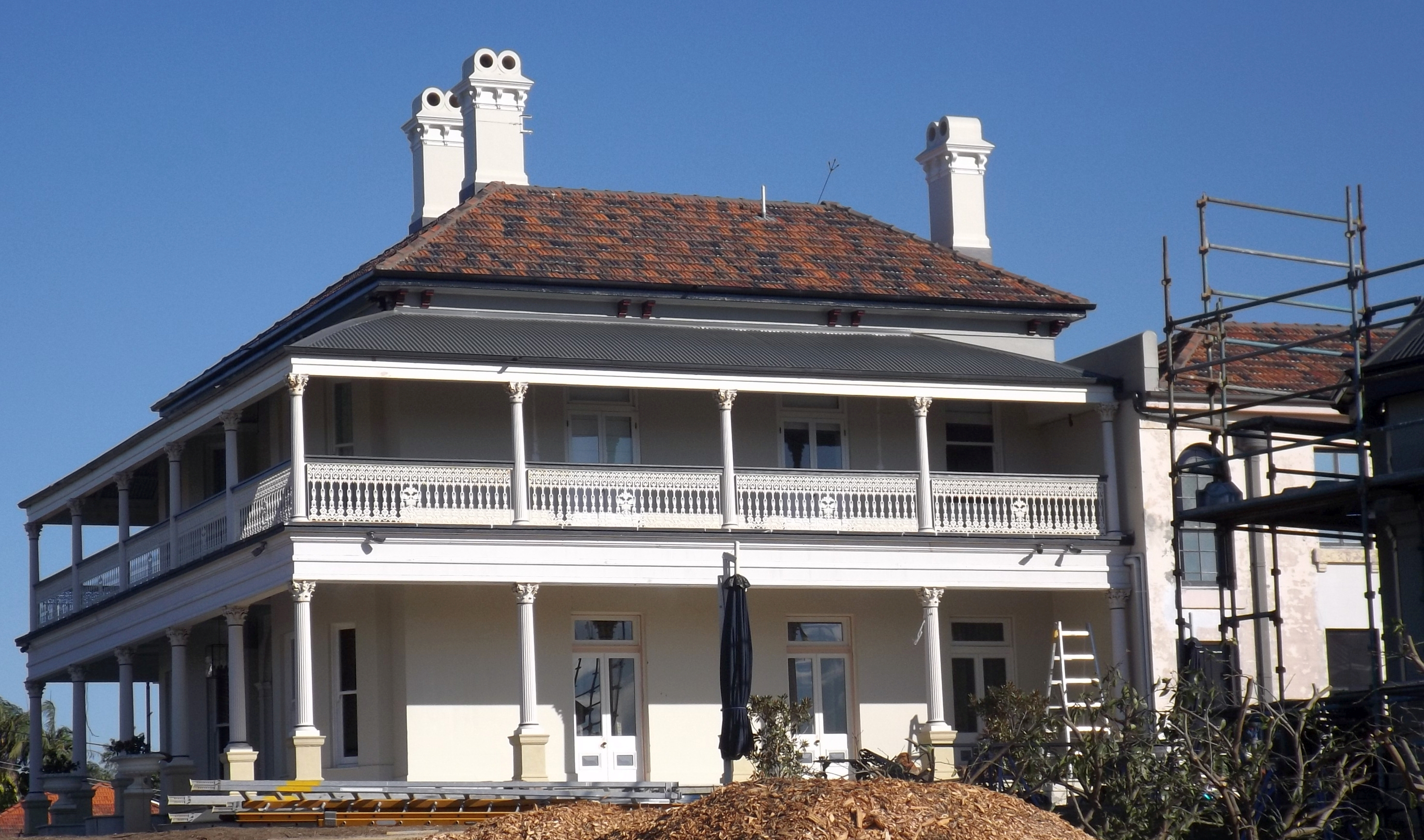
- Residence in 2015, while undergoing renovations

- Location within Queensland Location within Australia
- 27.4452°S 152.9796°E
- Location: 34 Glenlyon Drive, Ashgrove, City of Brisbane, Queensland, Australia

History
- Design period: 1870s–1890s (late 19th century)
- Built: 1876–1877
- Built for: Alexander Stewart

Queensland Heritage Register
- Official name: Glen Lyon, Marist Fathers Monastery
- Type: state heritage (landscape, built)
- Designated: 21 October 1992
- Reference no.: 600049
- Significant period: 1870s–1890s (fabric); 1870s–1990s (historical)
- Significant components: billiards room, dairy/creamery, cellar, well, stained glass window/s, gate – entrance, tennis court site, residential accommodation – servants' quarters, residential accommodation – main house

Glen Lyon is a heritage-listed villa at 34 Glenlyon Drive, Ashgrove, City of Brisbane, Queensland, Australia. It was built from 1876 to 1877. It is also known as Marist Fathers Monastery. It was added to the Queensland Heritage Register on 21 October 1992.

== History ==
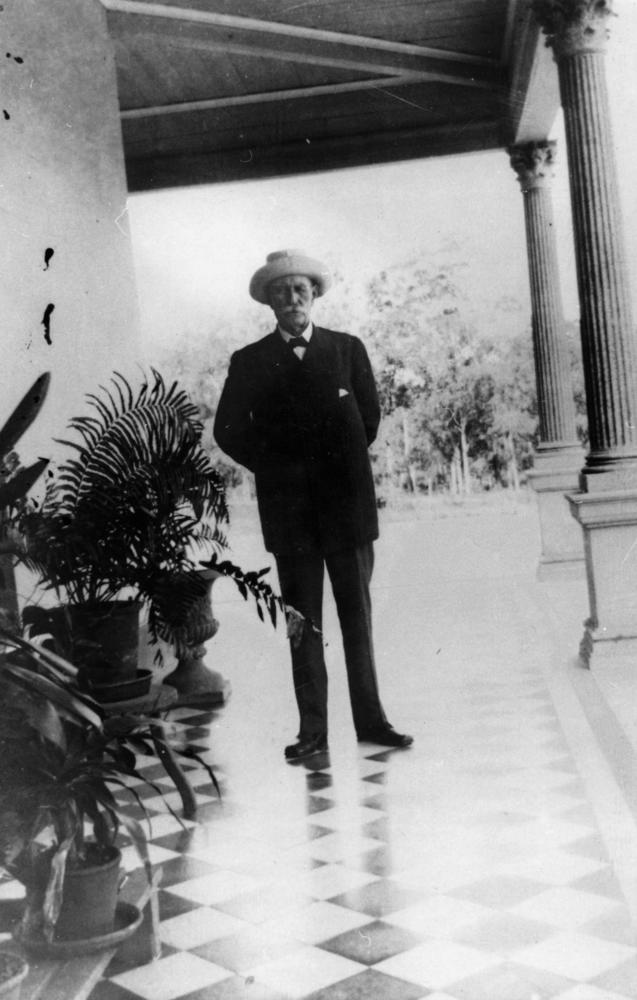
Alexander Stewart at Glen Lyon, Ashgrove, ca. 1917

This two-storeyed residence, the second oldest in the Ashgrove area (after the so-called 'Granite House' in nearby St Johns Wood), was erected in 1876–77 for Alexander Stewart, a partner in the merchant firm of Stewart & Hemmant. It was the centrepiece of a 250 acres (100 ha) estate acquired by Stewart in 1875 and 1876. The property, which extended along both sides of Enoggera Creek, was named Glen Lyon after Stewart's birthplace in Scotland (Glen Lyon).

The house was built by South Sea Islander labourers and the bricks were made from clay dug from the property itself.

Probably designed by architect James Cowlishaw, the original plans were modified when financial considerations forced Stewart to have a more modest residence erected.

At Glen Lyon, Stewart created a country estate. Within a few years the property contained a dairy herd, fowl runs, duck pond, an orchard and vegetable garden and an assortment of outbuildings. A well was sunk, detached servants' quarters and a dairy were constructed at the rear of the main house, and a coachman's cottage, known as the Lodge, was erected near Waterworks Road.

An avenue of bunya pines, which still stand, was planted the length of the front drive (now Glenlyon Drive). The present entrance gates are not the original; wrought iron gates set in pillars of granite, which formerly fronted Waterworks Road, have been removed to Stuartholme Convent.

A detached billiards room was constructed in the 1880s or early 1890s, and the grounds around the house were landscaped. Steps led from the billiard room to a tennis court.

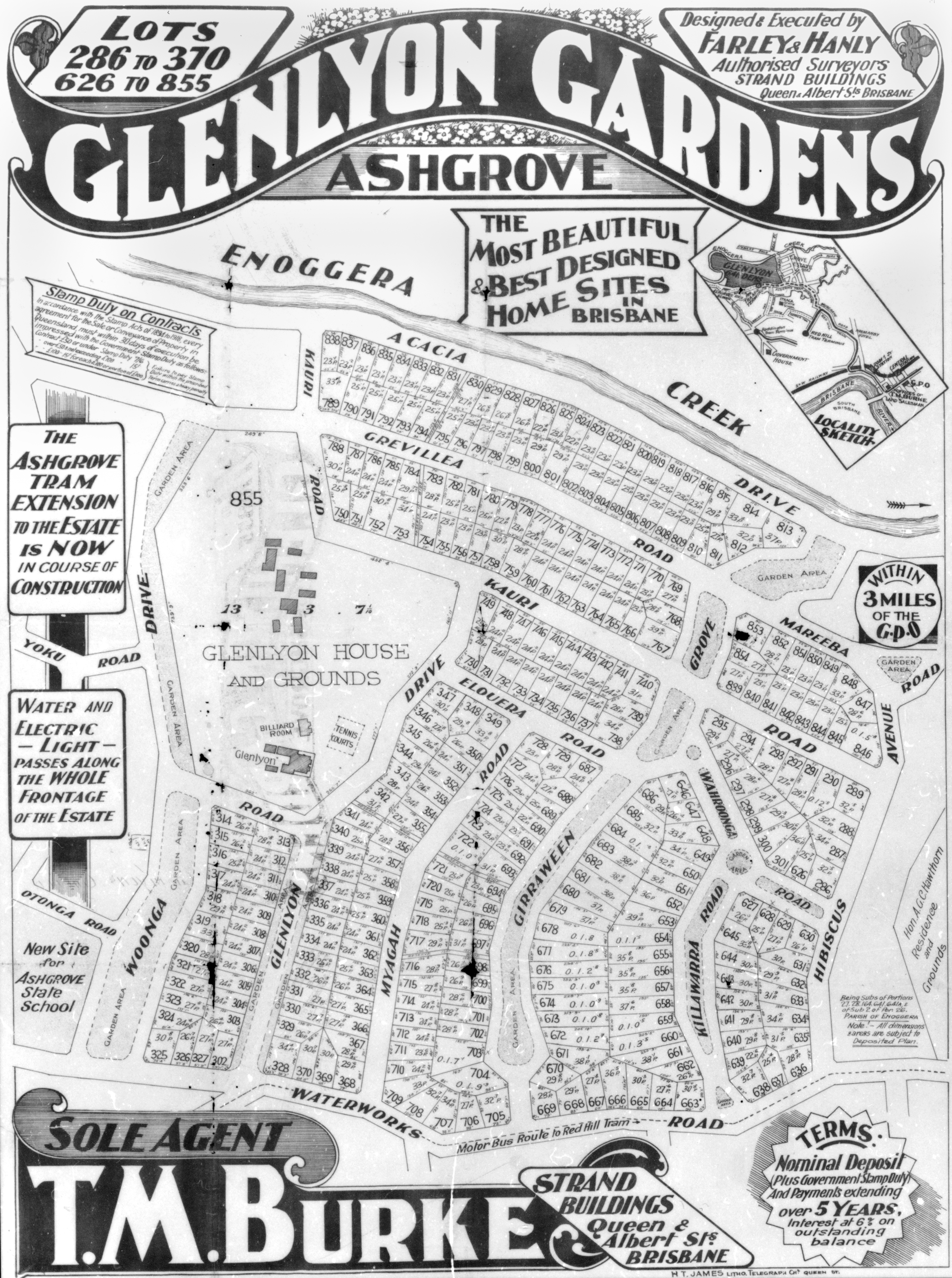
Estate Map of Glenlyon Gardens circa 1923–24

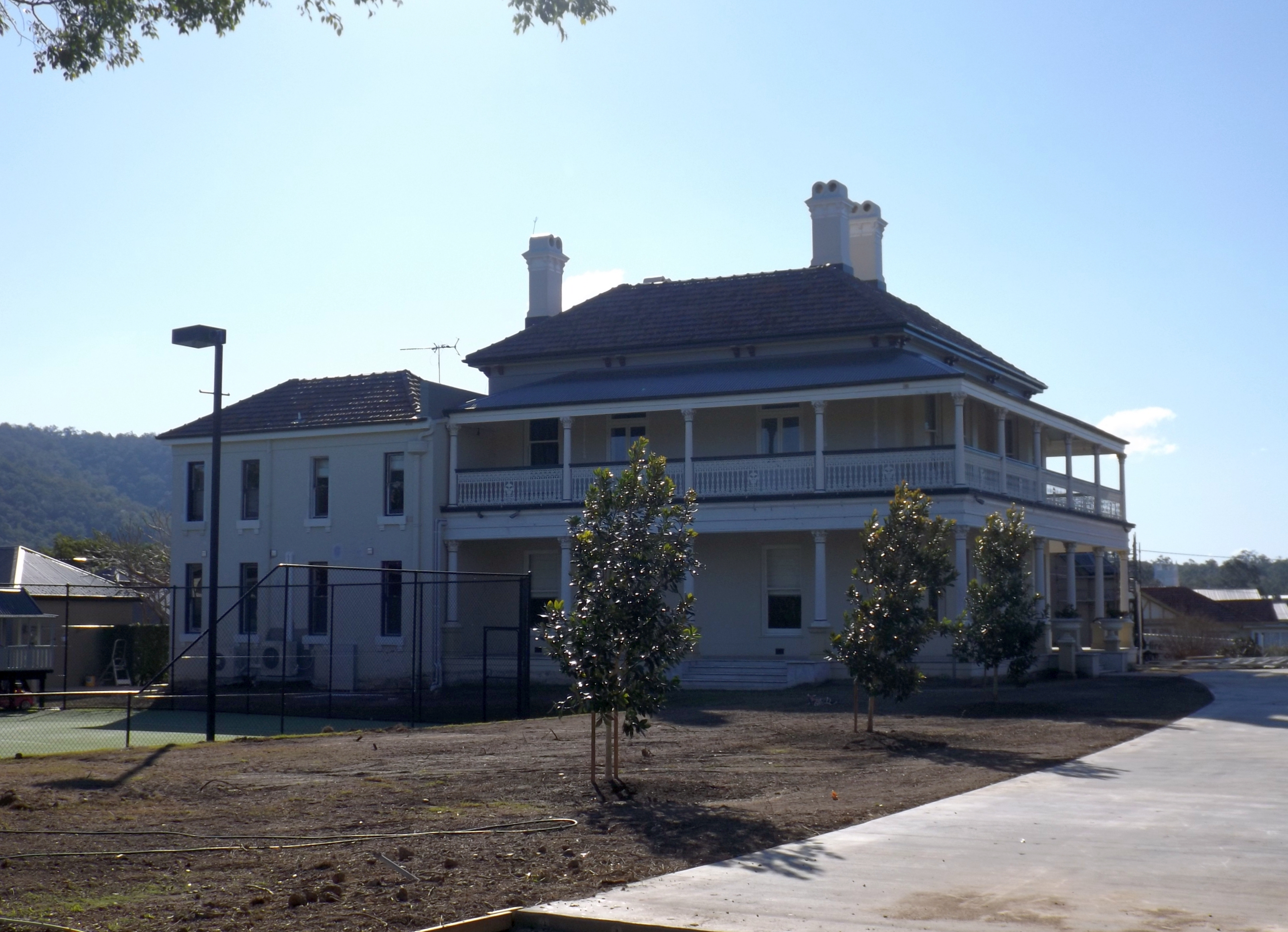
Building in 2015 while undergoing renovations

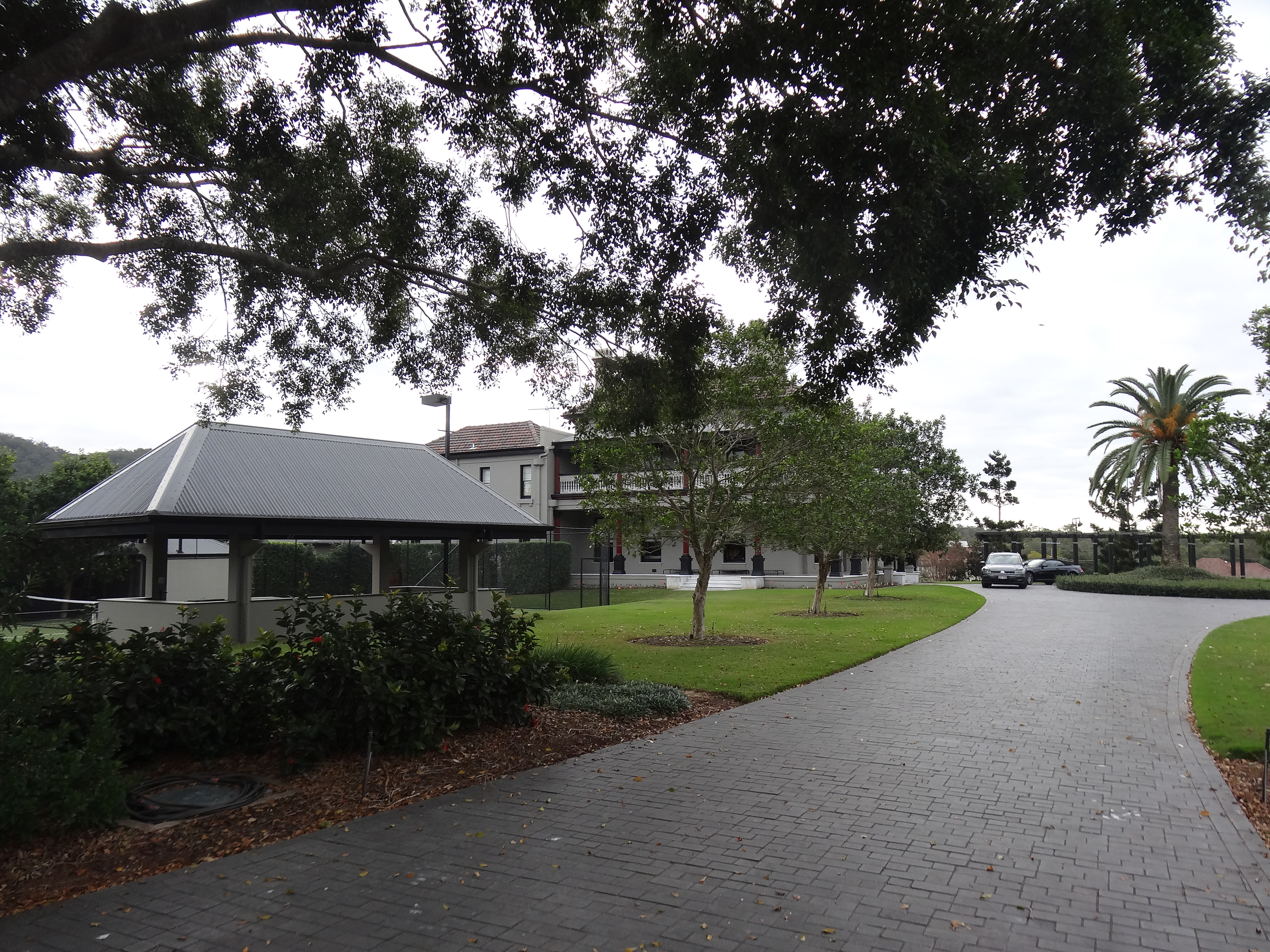
In 2023 post renovations

Alexander Stewart died in 1918 and the property was subsequently sold. Most of the estate was purchased by developer T M Burke who gradually subdivided it as the Glenlyon Estate. In March 1924 the house and 14 acres (5.7 ha) of surrounding land were purchased by Roman Catholic Archdiocese of Brisbane for a Catholic seminary. From about 1927 the house was rented to the New Zealand province of the Society of Mary (Marist Fathers), who purchased it in 1930. The Marist Fathers sold Glen Lyon c. 2003 and it currently functions as a private residence.

== Description ==
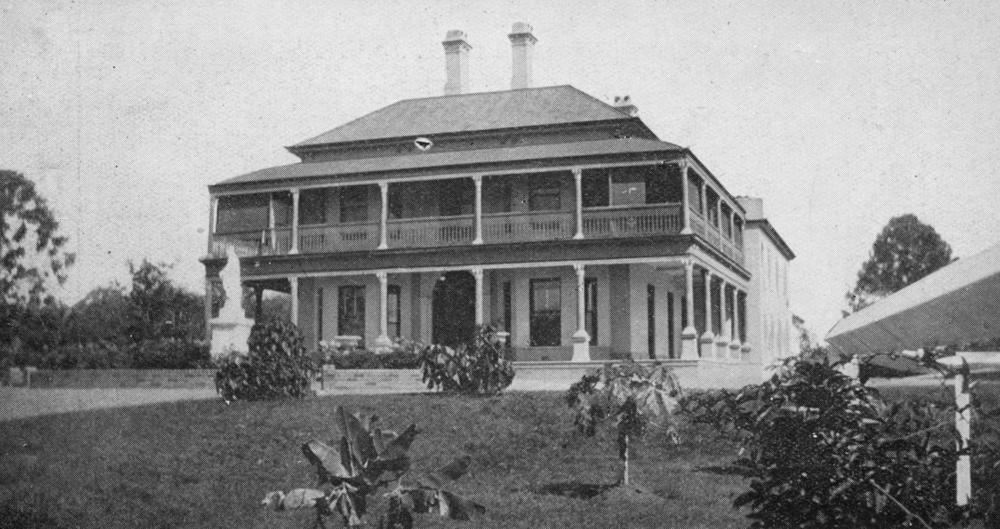
Glen Lyon, 1931

Glen Lyon is a large two-storeyed brick residence which is rendered to resemble ashlar. It has a hipped tiled roof, which originally was clad with slates. Wide verandahs on three sides at both levels are ornamented with cast-iron balustrading and Corinthian pillars.

At the front and north-eastern side, sets of white marble steps with urns lead to the lower verandah, which is paved with black and white marble. Bay windows to both levels on the front elevation have wide rectangular sashed windows, and the front entrance incorporates side panels and a fanlight of stained glass. Kitchen and bedroom wings at the rear enclose a courtyard containing a well.

Marble fireplaces are a feature of the interior, and the joinery is mainly of oak. Hand-painted decoration is visible on one of the ceilings. An elaborate stained glass window above the central staircase bears the motto of the first owners – Semper fidelis (always faithful) – but the lion's head family crest formerly located beneath this has been replaced by depictions of the Virgin Mary and Child.

Adjacent to the residence is a chapel which was formerly a billiards room, gun room and cellar. It is a small rendered brick building with a corrugated-iron hipped roof, bay windows, and arched porches. Most of the windows contain stained glass.

The detached brick dairy is externally intact, but has been converted into a toilet block. The former servants' quarters remains, as does the well.

The house and outbuildings remain on a much reduced site of approximately 0.78 of a hectare.

== Heritage listing ==
Glen Lyon was listed on the Queensland Heritage Register on 21 October 1992 having satisfied the following criteria.

The place is important in demonstrating the evolution or pattern of Queensland's history.

Glen Lyon is one of the earliest residences in the Enoggera Creek area, and is closely associated with the development of the suburb of Ashgrove.

The place demonstrates rare, uncommon or endangered aspects of Queensland's cultural heritage.

Glen Lyon is a rare and substantially intact late 1870s country house with associated outbuildings and gardens, and an avenue of trees.
