= Ithaca, Queensland =

Neighbourhood in Red Hill, Brisbane

Coordinates: 27°27′30.85″S 153°0′2.39″E

Ithaca is a former suburb of Brisbane, Australia. Since 1975, Ithaca has been designated a neighbourhood within the suburb of Red Hill in Brisbane.

== Origin of the name ==
The name of the suburb is believed to have been bestowed by Sir George Ferguson Bowen, Governor of Queensland (1859–1867), after the Ionian Island of Ithaca, the subject of a book he had authored.

== Geography ==
Traditionally, Ithaca was bound by Jubilee Terrace to the west, Ithaca Creek to the north, the suburb of Red Hill to the east and the suburb of Paddington to the south. Therefore, despite the official designation as being part of Red Hill, the former suburb of Ithaca appears to span the present suburbs of Red Hill, Paddington and Bardon.

== History ==
Ithaca was once the centre of the former local government areas of Shire of Ithaca, later Town of Ithaca.

The Ithaca Town Council Chambers were built in 1910 at 99 Enoggera Terrace (then in Ithaca, now in Red Hill). With the amalgamation of the Town of Ithaca into City of Brisbane in 1925, the building became the property of by the Brisbane City Council. Since then it has been used as a council depot, library and as the Red Hill Kindergarten. It is currently used as a community hall, known as Ithaca Hall.

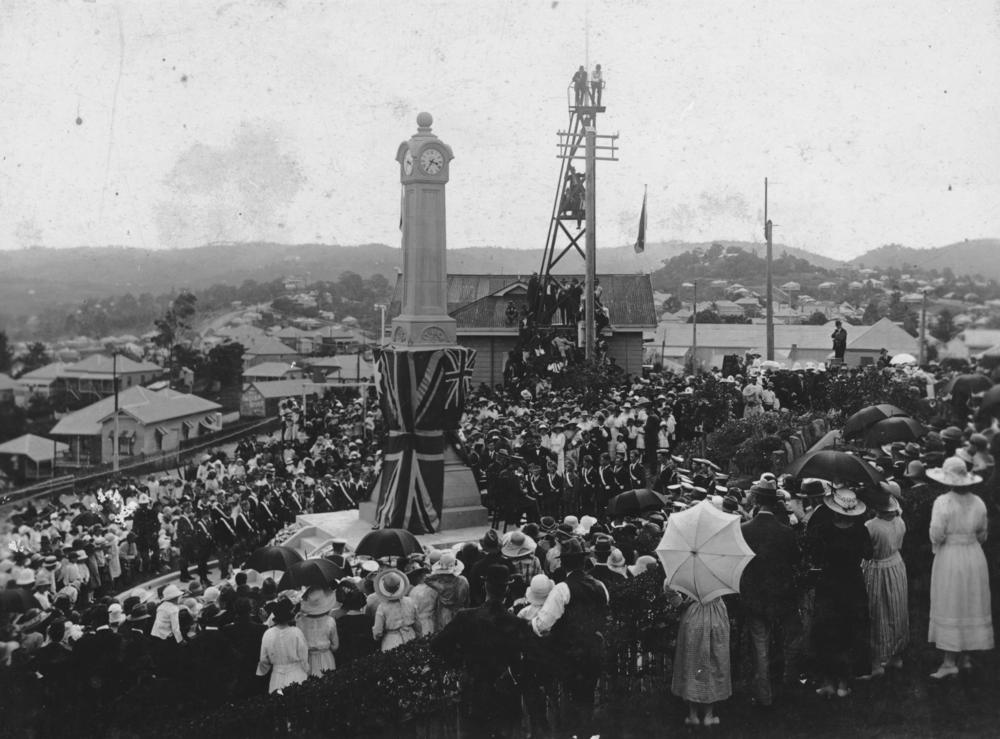
Unveiling of the Ithaca War Memorial in Paddington, Brisbane, 1922

On 25 February 1922, Sir Matthew Nathan, the Governor of Queensland unveiled the Ithaca War Memorial to commemorate local people who had died in World War I.

The Ithaca Town Council Chambers were listed on the Queensland Heritage Register in 2000.

== Ithaca today ==
The Ithaca name still persists in a number of local places:

- the Ithaca Hall (the former Ithaca Town Hall)
- the Ithaca War Memorial on Ennogera Terrace, Paddington
- the old Ithaca Fire Station at 140 Enoggera Terrace, Paddington
- the Ithaca Swimming Pool at 131 Caxton Street, Paddington
- the Ithaca Creek State School in Lugg Street, Bardon
