= Town of Ithaca =

Local government area of Queensland, Australia

Coordinates: 27°27′21.42″S 153°00′05.93″E

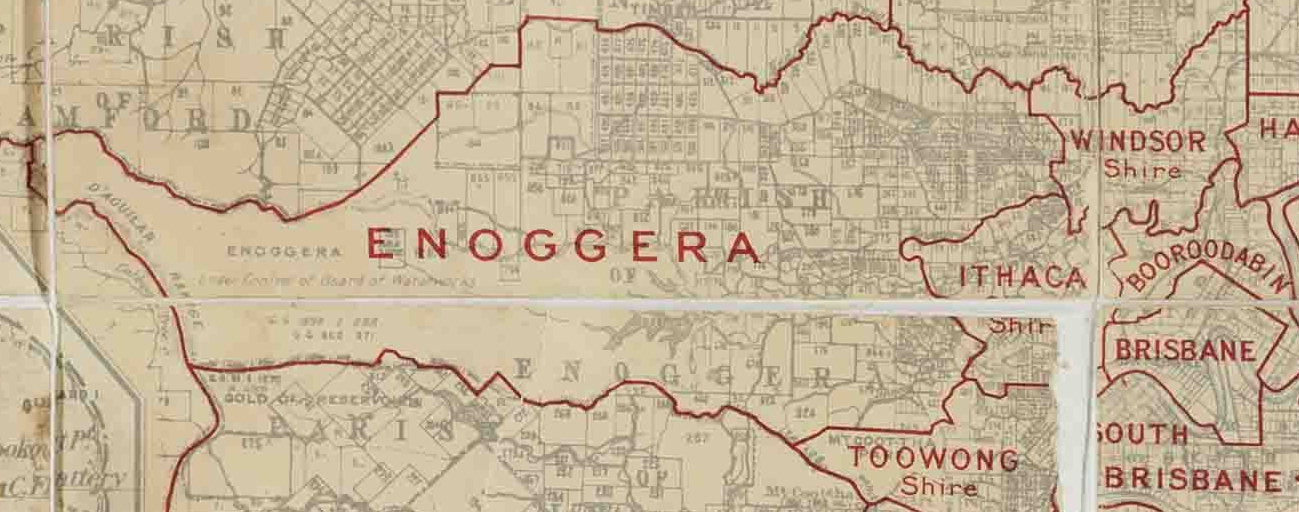
Map of Shire of Ithaca and adjacent local government areas, March 1902

The Town of Ithaca is a former local government area of Queensland, Australia, located in inner western Brisbane.

== History ==
The Ithaca Division was first proclaimed in 1879, and originally covered an area that stretched from Windsor, Kelvin Grove and Milton in the east, through to The Gap and beyond the Enoggera Dam in the west. In 1887 the division was split into the Shire of Windsor and the Enoggera Division, with the remainder in the south east becoming the Shire of Ithaca. Ithaca was proclaimed a town in 1903.

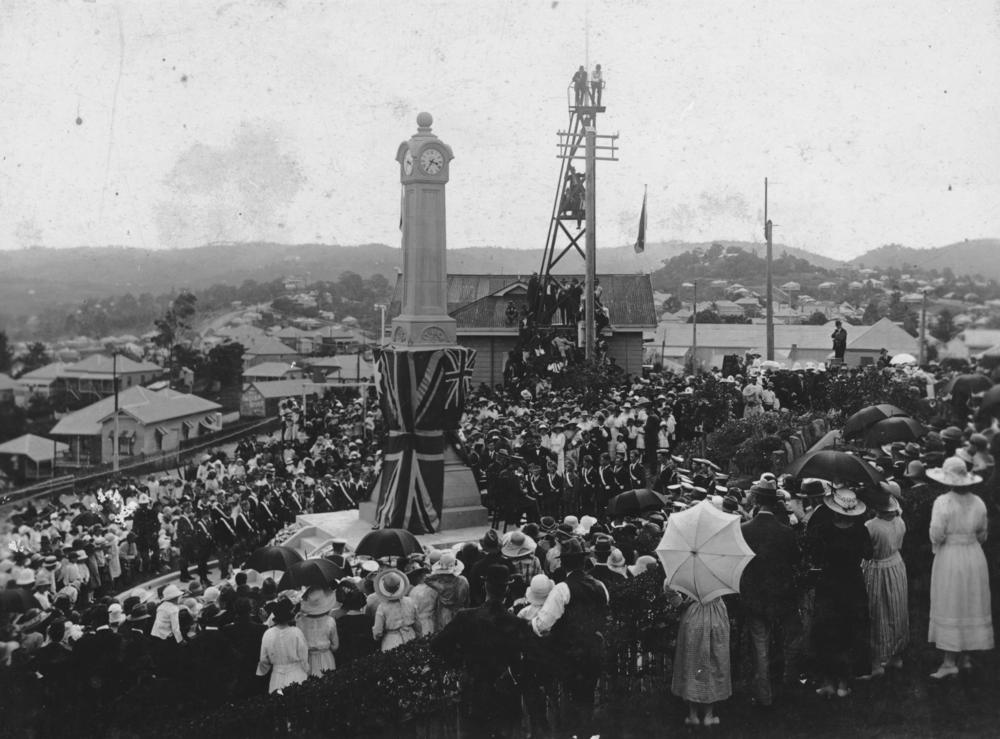
Unveiling of the Ithaca War Memorial in Paddington, Brisbane, 1922

On 25 February 1922, Sir Matthew Nathan, the Governor of Queensland unveiled the Ithaca War Memorial to commemorate local people who had died in World War I.

Ithaca was amalgamated into the newly created City of Brisbane in 1925.

== Geography ==
The Town of Ithaca comprised most of the inner western suburbs of Brisbane from Kelvin Grove Road to the foot of Mount Coot-tha. Its boundary followed Enoggera Creek to the north, Coopers Camp, Simpsons and Boundary Roads in Bardon to the west, and Baroona and Milton Roads to the south. Hale Street and an area just before the junction of Waterworks/Musgrave Road and Kelvin Grove Road formed the south-eastern extremity of the town. This eastern boundary was shared with the Brisbane Municipal Council; the Brisbane side of Hale Street was paved and channelled while the Ithaca side was not.

== Ithaca Town Council Chambers ==
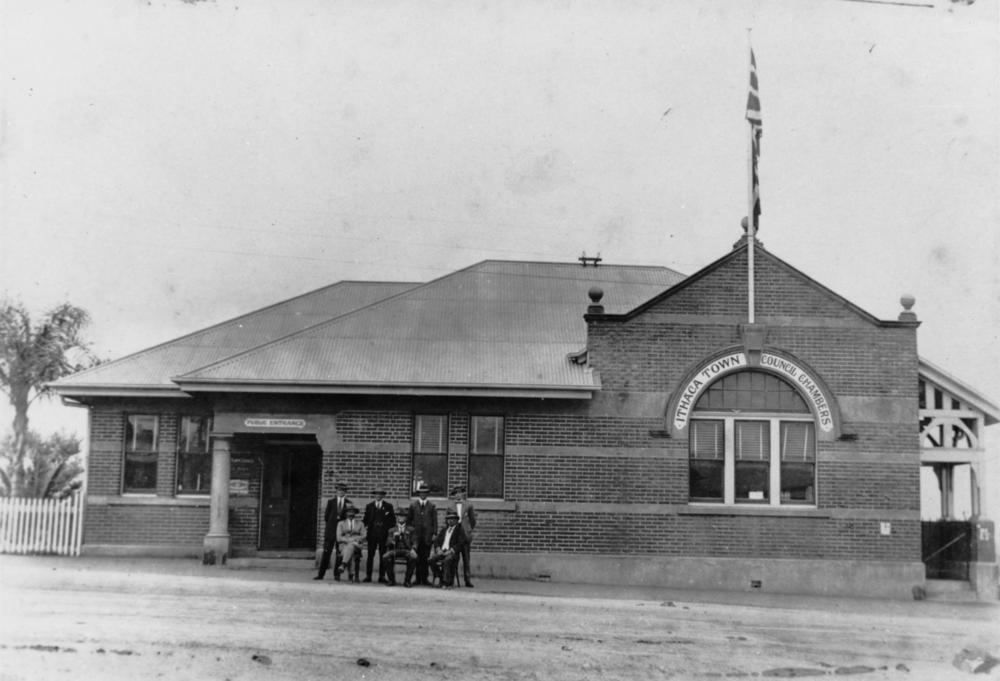
The Ithaca Town Council Chambers in Enoggera Terrace in 1920.

The Ithaca Town Council Chambers were built in 1910 at 99 Enoggera Terrace, in the then suburb of Ithaca (now in the suburb of Red Hill). With the amalgamation into City of Brisbane in 1925, the building became the property of the Brisbane City Council. Since then it has been used as a council depot, library and as the Red Hill Kindergarten. It is currently used as a community hall.

The Ithaca Town Council Chambers was listed on the Queensland Heritage Register in 2000.

The Ithaca Embankments, a council urban beautification scheme, were listed on the Queensland Heritage Register in 1993.

== Presidents and mayors ==
- 1888–1889: George Edward Cooper
- 1890: W. I. Boys
- 1901: Arthur George Clarence Hawthorn
- 1906: George Phillip Reading
- 1907: George Thomas Sweetman
- 1908: Robert McCook
- 1909: George Hall
- 1910: James Bray Lugg
- 1911: Silvanus White
- 1912: Frederick Thomas Morris
- 1913: Arthur George Clarence Hawthorn
- 1914: Robert Speedy
- 1915: William Robert Warmington
- 1916: James Bray Lugg
- 1917: John Tait
- 1918: Arthur Kaye
- 1919: John Fairfax Hayward
- 1920: Frederick Edward Hampson
- 1921: Leslie Howard Tooth
- 1925: William Robert Warmington

== See also ==
- History of Brisbane
