= Glentworth =

Glentworth can refer to:

- Glentworth, Lincolnshire, a village in England
- Glentworth, Saskatchewan, an unincorporated community in Canada
- SS Glentworth, a cargo steamer launched in 1920
- Glentworth, Paddington, a house in Paddington, Queensland
- Sir William Wray, 1st Baronet, of Glentworth, (c. 1555–1617), English Member of Parliament
- William Pery, 1st Baron Glentworth (1721–1794), Anglican bishop in Ireland
- Marguerite Linton Glentworth (1882–1956), American author
