= Eveline Burchill =

Irish dancer, choreographer and dance teacher

- Born: 20 November 1905; Cork, Ireland
- Died: 18 January 1987 (aged 81); County Dublin

Eveline Burchill (20 November 1905 – 18 January 1987) was an Irish dancer, dance teacher and judge, and choreographer.

== Early life ==
Eveline Burchill was born in Cork on 20 November 1905. She was one of four children of James Orr Burchill and Lucy Burchill (née Power). Her father was the managing director of the Singer sewing-machine company. The family moved to Dublin and lived on Eaton Square, Terenure. Burchill attended the Diocesan School, Dublin. On the advice of their family doctor, due to her delicate health, Burchill took up dancing. She moved to London to study dance full-time as a teenager, studying ballet under Judith Espinosa and ballroom dancing from Josephine Bradley. She performed in a ballet at the Plaza Theatre, London at age 15.

== Career ==
Burchill decided to concentrate on teaching instead of performance and returned to Dublin in the 1920s. She set up her dancing academy in Rathmines, and also gave classes at Moran's Hotel. She taught adagio, ballet, ballroom, character and Latin dancing styles. She moved the academy to 122A St Stephen's Green West in 1940, with a later subsidiary school, the Studio Stella Ballroom in Rathmines. She married George Begley, a former pupil, in July 1943. The couple ran the schools together until their separation in 1953. Following their divorce, Begley took over the school in Rathmines. When 122 St Stephen's Green was demolished in 1974, Burchill taught in the Rathmines and Rathgar Musical Society hall among other venues. She retired in 1983. Until 1973, she gave dancing recitals every second year in Dublin, first in the Theatre Royal and then in the Gaiety Theatre. She designed the costumes and arranged the choreography with the help of her sister, Sheela Ballagh. She collaborated with Austin Clarke and Mary Davenport O'Neill.

== Later life and death ==
Burchill was an adjudicator at ballroom dancing competitions across Britain and Europe, including the International Ballroom Dancing Championships in the Albert Hall, London in 1963. She regularly attended the London congress of the Imperial Society of Teachers of Dancing as a fellow. Lynn Doyle wrote two ballets for Burchill, The servants’ ball and Wild oats. When she moved out of her St Stephen's Green flat, she relocated to Cross Avenue, Blackrock, Dublin. She died in a nursing home in County Dublin on 18 January 1987 and is buried in Mount Jerome cemetery.
