= Glentworth, Paddington =

Glentworth
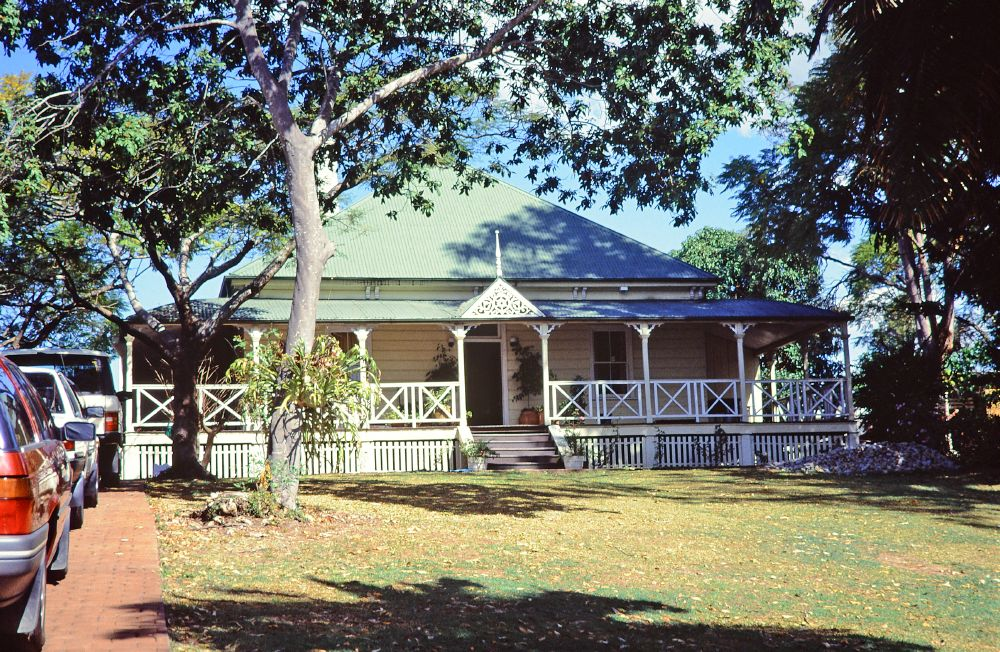
- Glentworth

- Location within Queensland Location within Australia
- 27.4682°S 152.9965°E
- Location: 34 Howard Street, Paddington, City of Brisbane, Queensland, Australia

History
- Design period: 1870s–1890s (late 19th century)
- Built: c. 1879

Site notes
- Architectural style: Victorian Filigree Queenslander

Queensland Heritage Register
- Official name: Glentworth
- Type: state heritage (built)
- Designated: 21 October 1992
- Reference no.: 600287
- Significant period: 1870s/1880s (fabric, historical)
- Significant components: views to, vista/s, residential accommodation – main house

Glentworth is a heritage-listed detached house at 34 Howard Street, Paddington, City of Brisbane, Queensland, Australia. It was built c. Nov 1879. It was added to the Queensland Heritage Register on 21 October 1992.

== History ==
Glentworth, a single-storeyed, high-set timber residence, stands on the original Bayswater subdivisions purchased by Katherine Mary Pery in 1879. The Hon. Cecil Standish Stackpole Pery was a clerk in the titles office.

In 1888 the Chalk family bought the property, which remained their home until the mid-1960s. Michael Chalk was a highly successful bus proprietor, whose business provided vital communication links between the western suburbs and the city.

In 1967 the property passed to the Salvation Army, which resold it in 1975. The residence remains a family home.

The home has since been renovated with modern extensions added to the rear of the property. The existing frontage design has been maintained and is a prime example of an 1880s Queensland timber colonial residence.

== Description ==
Glentworth is a single-storeyed timber house on stumps, with a central axial corridor and wide verandahs to three sides.

It has a pyramid-shaped, corrugated iron roof crowned by a large timber finial. Convex iron-sheeted verandah roofs are separated from the main roof by a small cornice and paired timber console brackets.

Verandah decoration is restrained: slender timber posts with capitals and brackets; cross-braced timber balustrading; and a timber fretwork pediment of intricate design crowned by another tall timber finial, above the entrance.

The cladding is of 12-inch (300 mm) wide chamferboards, and linings and partitions are of vertically jointed tongue and groove.

Externally the house retains its original character, although little remains of the 19th century garden layout.

Glentworth is situated above a gently rising lawn bordered by tall palms and trees, and is visible for a considerable distance from the north. It dominates the vista at the top of Agars Street, and is associated visually with Boondah, Baroona and other early timber residences in Howard Street, Rosalie.

== Heritage listing ==
Glentworth was listed on the Queensland Heritage Register on 21 October 1992 having satisfied the following criteria.

The place is important in demonstrating the evolution or pattern of Queensland's history.

Glentworth, constructed possibly c. 1880, is significant historically for its association with the early development of Rosalie as a middle-class garden suburb.

The place is important in demonstrating the principal characteristics of a particular class of cultural places.

It has representational value as a substantially intact, classic Queensland timber colonial residence of the early 1880s, and makes an aesthetic contribution to the historic Rosalie townscape.

The place is important because of its aesthetic significance.

It has representational value as a substantially intact, classic Queensland timber colonial residence of the early 1880s, and makes an aesthetic contribution to the historic Rosalie townscape.
