= Paddington Water Tower =

Water tower in Paddington, Queensland

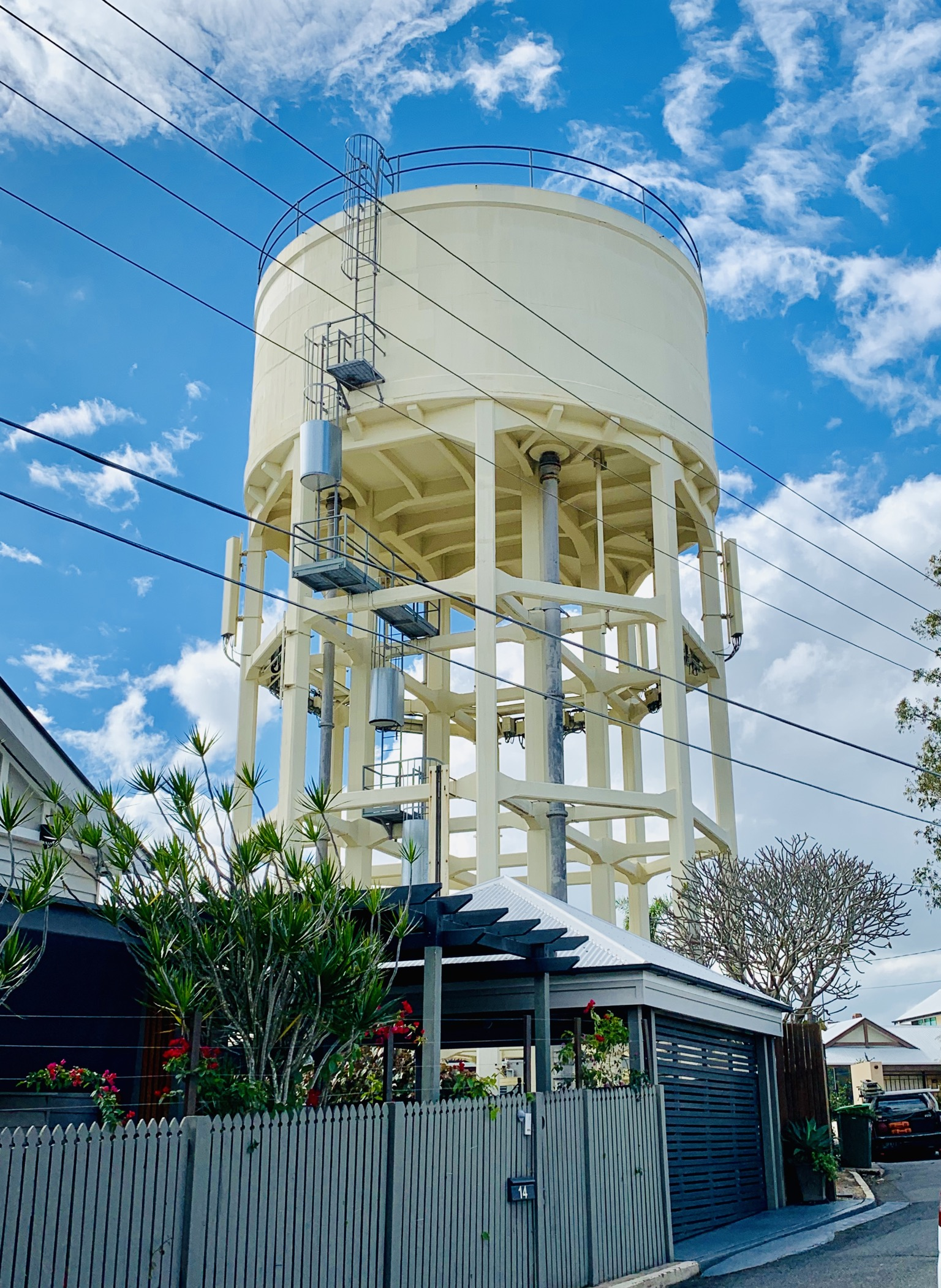
- Paddington Water Tower, 2019

- Location within Queensland Location within Australia
- 27.4589°S 152.9895°E
- Location: 16 Garfield Drive, Paddington, City of Brisbane, Queensland, Australia

History
- Design period: 1919–1930s (interwar period)
- Built: 1927

Site notes
- Architect: Metropolitan Water Supply & Sewerage Board

Queensland Heritage Register
- Official name: Paddington Water Tower
- Type: state heritage (built)
- Designated: 23 June 2000
- Reference no.: 601831
- Significant period: 1927 (fabric); 1910s–1930s (historical)
- Significant components: pump house, tower – water
- Builders: day labour

Paddington Water Tower is a heritage-listed water tower at 16 Garfield Drive, Paddington, City of Brisbane, Queensland, Australia. It was designed by Metropolitan Water Supply & Sewerage Board and built by day labour in 1927. It was added to the Queensland Heritage Register on 23 June 2000.

== History ==
By the beginning of the 20th century, Brisbane was drawing most of its water from the Brisbane River at Mount Crosby. Enoggera Dam and Gold Creek Dam were also feeding into the system. At this stage none of the supplies were filtered and Brisbane's water supply was neither treated nor tested until the first decade of the twentieth century.

In 1907, American hydraulic engineer, Allen Hazen, was engaged by the Brisbane Board of Waterworks to report on the amplification of Brisbane's supply. He recommended against the construction of a dam on the Brisbane River in its middle catchment because of his perception of the danger of rapid loss of storage capacity because of siltation. He recommended storage on Cabbage Tree Creek, a tributary of the Brisbane River, some 19 kilometres (12 mi) upstream of Mount Crosby and further recommended the site of the Somerset Dam on the Stanley River for future amplification of storage.

From about 1916, the shape of Mount Crosby and nearby Holt's Hill underwent a series of changes with structures erected, extended and demolished in response to the water quality demands of Brisbane, and after 1922, of Ipswich.

To provide facilities to residents on elevated land for a full water supply, service reservoirs were constructed at Bartley's Hill in 1907 and 1919, Enoggera in 1912, Holt's Hill in 1919, Tarragindi in 1923, Paddington in 1927, Roles Hill in 1928, Eildon Hill in 1930, Bulimba in 1940, Sparkes Hill in 1941 and Bracken Ridge in 1944. Previous service reservoirs had been constructed at Wickham Terrace in 1870 and 1882, Highgate Hill in 1889 and the Mount Crosby High Level in 1891.

Supplying water to the higher parts of Paddington had always been difficult, so it was a great benefit to residents when the Water Board opened this tower in 1927 which was fed from Enoggera Dam. The Board had striven for 12 years to obtain the £12,000 necessary to build the Paddington Tower. The Tower was dedicated on 4 March 1927 and was officially opened by Mr Ernest James Theodore Manchester, President of the Metropolitan Water Supply and Sewerage Board, with members of the board and local residents in attendance. The tower was described as the finest piece of work constructed by any authority and at the time was the most expensive single structure ever to have been constructed in the Town of Ithaca.

At the opening the President said it had always been the aim of the Water Board to afford facilities to provide a full water supply to all residents on elevated land and that in time he hoped to see all elevated lands graced by water towers. The power for the motor which hoisted the water into the tank was switched on by Mr J J Roberts who referred to Paddington Heights as the Dress Circle of Brisbane.

The structure was designed by the Board's engineer and erected by the board's staff with day labour on a site 335 feet (102 m) above sea level. The tank is composed of reinforced concrete and the height from the highest point is 70 feet (21 m). It is capable of holding 100,000 imperial gallons (450,000 L; 120,000 US gal). The Tramway Department provided the electricity required for the centrifugal pump which propelled water from the tank below

A cottage was erected alongside the tank on the vacant piece of ground shortly after the tower was opened so that the turncock would live on the premises and give every attention to see that the tank was constantly well filled with water.

== Description ==
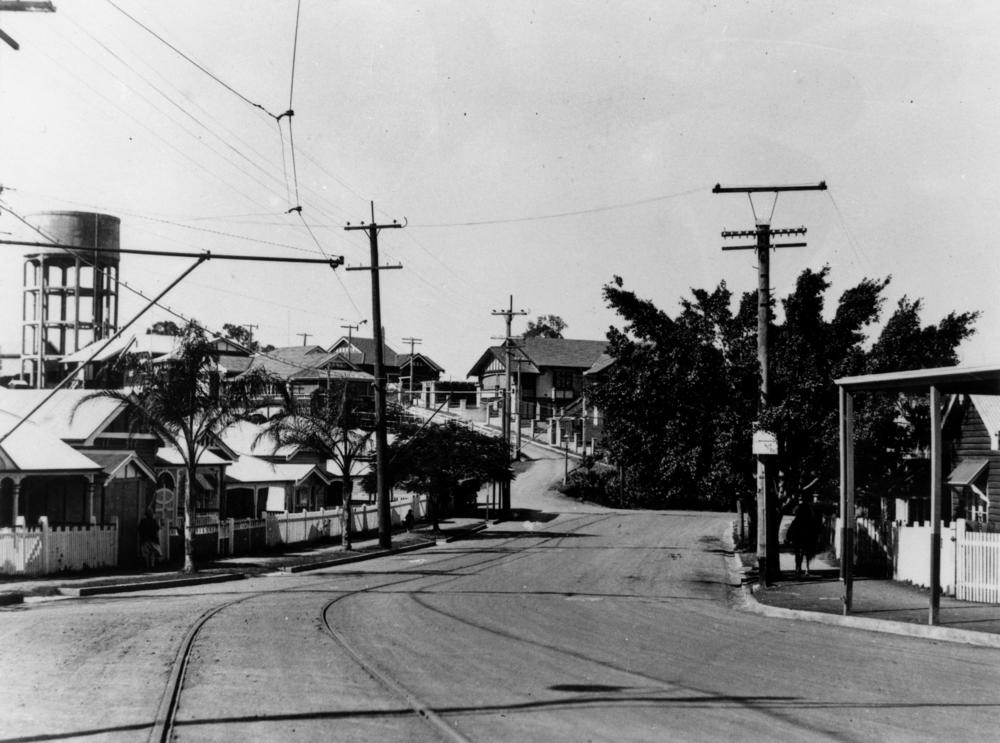
Macgregor Terrace in Bardon (Paddington Water Tower on left horizon), circa 1929

Paddington Water Tower is located on a 529-square-metre (5,690 sq ft) allotment on Archibald's Hill. The site slopes northward away from Garfield Terrace down to Tooth Avenue. The Tower is located adjacent to the Garfield Terrace boundary with the pump house adjacent to its western side.

Paddington Water Tower is surplus to water supply requirements and is no longer in use. It is essentially unaltered from its original appearance. Located on Archibald's Hill, it is one of Brisbane's oldest and most prominent landmarks. It is probably the only one of its type in Queensland being a reinforced concrete tank elevated on concrete columns.

Of the other service reservoirs erected in Brisbane, Wickham Terrace (1870 & 1882), Mount Crosby High Level (1891), Holt's Hill (1919) and Bulimba (1940) are also now surplus to requirements and not in use.

The Paddington tank and its tower are of reinforced concrete construction The circular tank is supported on a structural framework of twelve columns and octagonal grids of haunched beams. The water tower is 70 feet (21 m) high and the tank has a capacity of 100,000 imperial gallons (450,000 L; 120,000 US gal) and the top water level is 335 feet (102 m) AHD.

The tower is a prominent Brisbane landmark in the north western suburbs. It is visible from miles around and most vantage points and is readily recognisable.

== Heritage listing ==
Paddington Water Tower was listed on the Queensland Heritage Register on 23 June 2000 having satisfied the following criteria.

The place is important in demonstrating the evolution or pattern of Queensland's history.

Paddington Water Tower is important in demonstrating a phase in the history of Brisbane's water supply and the technological difficulties of providing reticulated water to elevated sites.

The place demonstrates rare, uncommon or endangered aspects of Queensland's cultural heritage.

The Paddington Water Tower is a rare example of an elevated reinforced concrete water tank. It is probably the only one of its type in Queensland being a reinforced concrete tank elevated on concrete columns.

The place is important because of its aesthetic significance.

The Paddington Water Tower is important for its aesthetic qualities as a readily recognisable landmark. It is one of Brisbane's most prominent landmarks.
