= Foresters' Hall, Paddington =

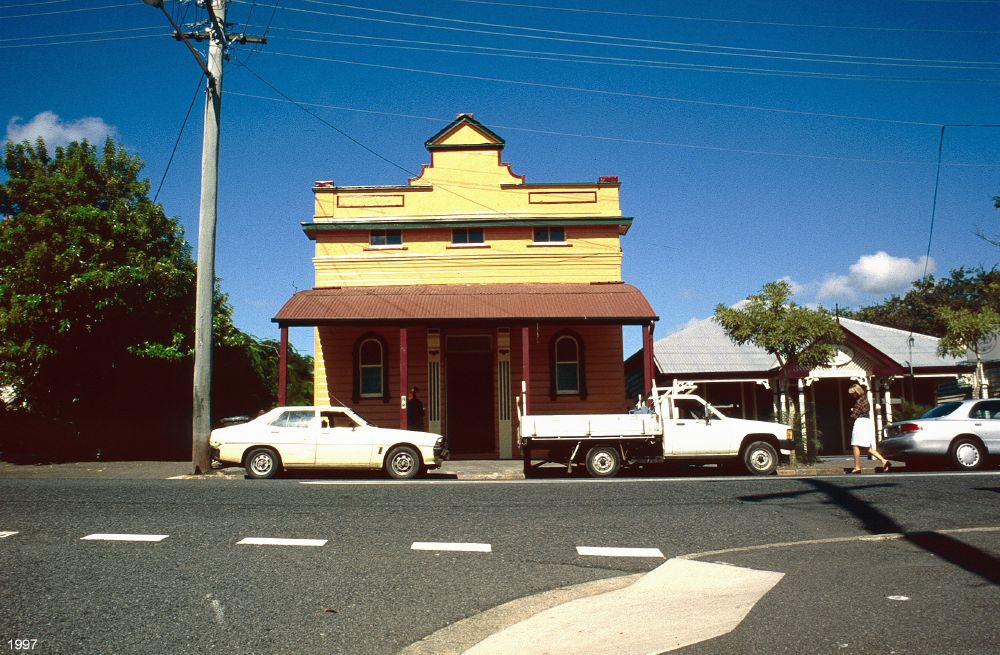

- Location within Queensland Location within Australia
- 27.4602°S 153.0018°E
- Location: 16 Latrobe Terrace, Paddington, City of Brisbane, Queensland, Australia

History
- Design period: 1870s–1890s (late 19th century)
- Built: 1888

Site notes
- Architect: Alexander Brown Wilson

Queensland Heritage Register
- Official name: Foresters' Hall
- Type: state heritage (built)
- Designated: 18 April 1997
- Reference no.: 601662
- Significant period: 1888, 1894 (fabric); 1888–1996 (historical)
- Significant components: residential accommodation – caretaker's quarters, gallery, stage/sound shell
- Builders: W Taylor

Foresters' Hall is a heritage-listed community hall at 16 Latrobe Terrace, Paddington, City of Brisbane, Queensland, Australia. It was designed by Alexander Brown Wilson and built in 1888 by W Taylor. It was added to the Queensland Heritage Register on 18 April 1997.

== History ==
This timber hall was built between June and September in 1888 for the Trustees of Court Foresters' Hope, number 6535 of the Ancient Order of Foresters' Friendly Society, United Brisbane District. The Paddington Foresters' Hall was designed by the Brisbane architect, Alexander Brown Wilson, and was built by W Taylor after his tender for £585 was accepted in May 1888. The hall was built on a subdivision of an estate originally purchased by Bennett Clay at a sale of crown land in 1861. The title deed was then transferred to John Robertson of Sydney in 1864. In 1885 Robertson subdivided his 17-acre (6.9 ha) estate when the trustees of Court Foresters' Hope purchased subdivision 22, apparently for £78.

Court Foresters' Hope was founded in Paddington in 1878 marking the beginning of expansion for the Ancient Order of Foresters in Queensland. Prior to the building of the Foresters' Hall in 1888, the court met at the former Methodist Church (no longer extant) at the corner of Given Terrace and Ranley Grove, Paddington.

The establishment of the Ancient Order of Foresters in Queensland dates from 1859 with the opening of Court Fortitude at Fortitude Valley. The Foresters' presence in Queensland was part of a social phenomenon which saw friendly societies become significant to the functioning of Australian society in the nineteenth and early twentieth centuries. The friendly societies came to Australia as part of the British philosophy of self-help and mutual aid which became prevalent during the industrial revolution.

Friendly societies were voluntary associations that traditionally provided financial benefits to their members, usually working men and their families, in case of sickness, injury or death, by drawing on funds to which each member contributed. They were a response to the lack of social welfare in western societies during this period. The idea of fraternity and ritual formed an important element of the friendly societies as did the social activities that the individual branches provided for their members.

The Ancient Order of Foresters' was one of the largest affiliated orders of friendly societies which was governed by a district body and made up of local branches or "courts". It was established in Britain in 1834 as a splinter group of the Royal Foresters which dated from 1790. Its tradition is linked with the mythology of Robin Hood and this is reflected in the ritual, regalia, hierarchy and names of the individual courts.

The first Australian court of the Ancient Order of Foresters was established in New South Wales in 1843. By 1878 there were three successfully functioning courts in Queensland: Court Fortitude (1859), Court South Brisbane Hope (1878) and Court Foresters' Hope in Paddington (1878). In April 1881 the three pioneering courts of Brisbane took steps to form the United Brisbane District as the governing body for courts in Brisbane, Ipswich and Gympie. From 1878 to 1902, 57 new Foresters' courts were established throughout Queensland.

Foresters' Hall, which was established close to the junction of Given and Latrobe Terraces, commanded a prominent position within the growing township of Paddington. In the 1880s, land in Paddington was beginning to be subdivided and an increase in development was occurring at the time hall was built. Land sales were peaking and the foundations were being laid for Paddington to become a commuter suburb, transforming it from the sparsely populated semi-rural district of the 1860s and 70s. Foresters' Hall is a legacy of this development boom and its long established position has made it a feature of the Paddington townscape.

Court Foresters' Hope was one of the few courts in Queensland to possess its own hall. There are a number of examples of purpose-built friendly society halls from this period, including the first Foresters' Hall in Brunswick Street, Fortitude Valley, but many local friendly society branches leased other societies' halls for their meeting places.

The Paddington Foresters' Hall had a seating capacity of 320 people and provided a thriving community service to the growing population of Paddington. The hall was designed with the intention of creating revenue with two rooms at the front to be used by rent-paying shopkeepers and another three rooms at the front to accommodate a rent-paying caretaker. Two private rooms at the back were also let to the public and the hall was leased on a regular basis to many local groups. In 1906 these included the local Independent Order of Rechabites, the Salvation Army, the Ithaca Ratepayers Association, the Women's Christian Charity and the Theodore Unmack Society of Masons.

The original building specifications make reference to a verandah at the back of the hall with a staircase which led to rooms underneath the stage. The hall was lit by kerosene pendant lamps which were replaced with gas lighting in late 1892 or early 1893, for which task the hall's architect AB Wilson was consulted. In about November 1894, alterations were made to the front of the hall, again to Wilson's specifications. The shop-front windows were removed and replaced with the present sash windows, the gallery floor was altered, a girder was placed at the front of the gallery platform and a new stairway to the gallery was constructed in the north-western corner of the hall of material from the previous gallery stairs. The internal walls under the gallery were altered suggesting a change in the configuration of the rooms at the front of the hall. The front and vestibule doors were rehung closer to the front wall. The caretakers' residence was eventually moved underneath the hall to a four-roomed basement apartment which still exists.

Throughout the twentieth century Foresters' Hall continued to serve the local community and was registered as a public hall in 1927. It continued to operate as Court Foresters' Hope meeting place and was also used for local Labor Party meetings, among other organisations. The shops functioned in the front of the hall until about the late 1940s or 50s and the hall was also used as an electoral polling booth.

In 1976, after 88 years of ownership, Court Foresters' Hope sold the hall to the Royal Antediluvian Order of Buffaloes, a friendly society which had previously rented the hall from the Foresters. Court Foresters' Hope continues to meet at St Barnabas' Church, Red Hill. In 1996, the hall was sold again.

In November 2013, the building was being used by Vinnie's (a St. Vincent de Paul Thrift Store).

== Description ==
Foresters' Hall is located on the southern side of Latrobe Terrace near the intersection of Given Terrace. The single-storeyed timber building abuts the street frontage and has an awning that extends over the footpath to the roadside kerbing. The land slopes steeply down towards the rear of the property allowing for a small residence to be constructed at basement level, beneath the main hall.

Foresters' Hall is basically a rectangular form building set on concrete stumps and clad mainly with chamferboards, except at the rear where they have been replaced with weatherboards. The corrugated iron hipped roof is hidden from the street a pedimented parapet that extends across the building's front and partially to each side. The rear rooms of the building are roofed with a simple corrugated iron skillion. The front awning is constructed of timber with plain posts and a convex profiled corrugated iron roof. In contrast, the front entry to the building is embellished by a pair of ornamented timber pilasters and wide solid panelled door. At both sides of the door are small double-hung arched windows that are fitted with opaque wired glass. Above the awning but immediately below the parapet cornice there are also three small fixed paned windows. Large windows to both sides of the central hall consist of fixed and pivoting panes. These panes have recently been fitted with textured and coloured glass. External timber stairs and landings provide access to the building from the west side of the hall and to the basement level rooms.

At ground level Foresters' Hall internally consists of one large central hall with two rooms at the front and three rooms at the rear. The main entrance to the building is via a central vestibule that leads to a pair of original cedar panelled doors. Behind these doors is a second vestibule, formed by the recent installation of a pair of similar but partly glazed timber doors. On the west side of the original vestibule is a small room, currently accessible only from the hall. Evidence of a former doorway between this room and the vestibule still remains; however the entire wall has recently been glazed. On the east side of the vestibule, a slightly larger room has recently been created by the erection of a timber lined wall separating the area from the main hall. In this room is a small store and the original set of narrow timber stairs that lead up to a small two tiered gallery located above the front two rooms. Recently installed timber balustrading replaces the original simple balustrade at the front of the gallery.

The central hall is a large space with a stage area at the rear end. Full width timber arches separate the stage and gallery areas from the hall. Narrow timber steps lead up to the stage at both sides of the hall. Behind the stage are three rooms; a kitchen and two toilets. The wall dividing the stage area from the rear rooms is a single skinned timber lined wall with exposed cross bracing partially exposed in the kitchen area only. The toilet areas have been created by the installation of partition walls lined with fibrous cement sheeting. Ceramic tiling has been used to cover the timber floors in the toilet areas. Fretted fanlights above the toilet and kitchen doors are recent installations.

The coved ceilings and walls throughout the building are internally lined with 4" pine boards fixed horizontally. Decorative fretwork ventilators are fitted into the central hall ceiling. Partition walls are constructed of timber frames, lined on one side only with vertically orientated lining boards. Floors throughout the central hall and the front rooms are 4" wide timber boards. Below these is the original floorboards which are 6" wide.

At the basement level there are four rooms forming a small residence. Access to the rooms is via a set of recently constructed timber stairs approached from the narrow footpath on the building's western boundary. Each room is lined in vertically fixed timber boards. One room is fitted as a bathroom and another as a kitchen. Exposed diagonal bracing is evident in the kitchen area.

== Heritage listing ==
Foresters' Hall was listed on the Queensland Heritage Register on 18 April 1997 having satisfied the following criteria.

The place is important in demonstrating the evolution or pattern of Queensland's history.

Foresters' Hall, erected in 1888, demonstrates a way of life during the late nineteenth and early twentieth centuries when friendly societies were a prominent and expanding part of Queensland society. The societies provided a welfare service by means of mutual aid and this hall provided a headquarters for Court Foresters' Hope of the Ancient Order of Foresters' Friendly Society. The building is also of interest for its role as part of the 1880s development boom which transformed Paddington from a semi-rural area into a commuter suburb of Brisbane.

The place is important in demonstrating the principal characteristics of a particular class of cultural places.

The building is a typical and substantially intact example of a small 19th century Queensland hall.

The place is important because of its aesthetic significance.

According to the Queensland heritage register, Foresters' hall has some interesting architectural details which offers a strong aesthetic contribution to Latrobe Terrace and the suburb of Paddington as a dominant feature of the streetscape and townscape.

The place has a strong or special association with a particular community or cultural group for social, cultural or spiritual reasons.

Foresters' Hall possesses special association for the Paddington community as a local landmark which has provided a range of community services for the local people for over 100 years. The hall has a strong and long association with the activities of Court Foresters' Hope established over an 88-year period. Despite a change of ownership to the Hamilton Lodge of the Royal Antediluvian Order of Buffaloes in 1976, the hall had continuous use as a friendly society meeting place until 1996.
