= Josephine Bradley =

British ballroom dancer and teacher (1893–1985)

Josephine Mary Catherine Wellesley-Smith (née Bradley; 24 March 1893 – 16 February 1985) was a ballroom dancer and dance teacher. Although born in Dublin, she was raised from an early age in London, the youngest of eight children. Bradley was among the first ballroom dance professionals of the Imperial Society of Teachers of Dancing (ISTD) who standardised the basic techniques of foxtrot, tango, quickstep and waltz. These are the English ballroom dances of what is now the World Dance Council's International Dancesport category. For her activities she had earned herself an informal title "The First Lady of the Ballroom".

== The early years ==
=== Youth ===
Bradley's father was a strict Roman Catholic, who abhorred dancing and the theatre. He died when she was ten, and an older sister subsequently succumbed to tuberculosis. It was feared that Josephine might be infected, so the family moved from London to Chorley Wood, at that time a rural village.

=== Ballroom dance ===
In 1924 she danced with an American, G.K. Anderson, in a competition at the Embassy Club in Regent Street. She was the professional dancer of the two. They won that, and went on to win the Daily Sketch Foxtrot competition, for which pro-am couples were eligible. In the 1924 World Championship at the Queen's Hall, the couple won again, to become World Foxtrot Champions. In the overall World Championships for 1924 (professional), and again in 1925, Maxwell Stewart and Barbara Miles won, ahead of Victor Silvester and Phyllis Clarke.

That same year (1924), Bradley started her first dance school in the Knightsbridge Hotel. She was asked by the Imperial Society of Teachers of Dancing (ISTD) to join a working group to codify the dances and develop a syllabus for teachers. The ISTD formed its Ballroom Branch with Bradley, Eve Tynegate Smith, Murielle Simmons, Cynthia Humphreys and Victor Silvester as founder members. Bradley was a leading figure in the British ballroom dance world. She was active in ballroom dancing in general, and the ISTD in particular, right up to the end of her long life. Bradley was Chairman of the ISTD Ballroom Branch from 1924 to 1947. As an examiner for the ISTD, she toured Australia, New Zealand and South Africa. One of her pupils, Eveline Burchill, went on to set up a dance school in Dublin and also judged ISTD competitions.

== Marriage ==
In 1927 Bradley married Douglas Wellesley-Smith, whom she had met in 1919. He had won the Military Cross (MC) in World War I, as a captain in the 1st Battalion, the Lincolnshire Regiment. He had been twice wounded by bayonet thrusts, and they met when he was convalescing. Needing some light exercise, he came to her for dance lessons. They became regular dance partners in 1925. Their marriage lasted only four years until his death at the age of 35. She later found a dancing partner in Frank Ford, but she never married again.

== Ballroom orchestra ==
Bradley was one of several top-class dancers who sought to rival Victor Silvester. His 'big idea' was to provide strict-tempo music for dances and dance teaching studios, and he succeeded to an almost unbelievable extent. A feature of all the strict tempo bands was the absence of a singer, who might have interfered with the clarity of the rhythm. With record sales reaching 75 million, and his orchestra regularly on BBC radio (and later, television), Silvester was the dominant public figure in the dancing world.

Bradley became one of the few women to lead a British band between 1920 and 1950; others included Ivy Benson and Mrs. Jack Hylton. Bradley set up her group in 1935,^{p35} mainly as a recording band for Decca: Josephine Bradley and her Ballroom Orchestra. She had already, in 1930, directed the New Mayfair Dance Orchestra for His Master's Voice. Between March 1937 and October 1945 she recorded over 200 sides for Decca. Bradley's recordings sold well, and represent "the very best of ballroom music over half a century after they were made".

== Other events ==
She danced in the British film Let's Make a Night of It (1937), which contained the first sequence of formation dance. In it she and Frank Ford, together with Victor Silvester and his wife and two other couples, danced to Jack Jackson and his band.

== Sources ==
- Josephine Bradley & her Ballroom Orchestra: Dancing in the Dark. Vocalion CD EA6088
