= Ithaca Presbyterian Church =

Church building in Queensland, Australia

Coordinates: 27.45674°S 153.00153°E

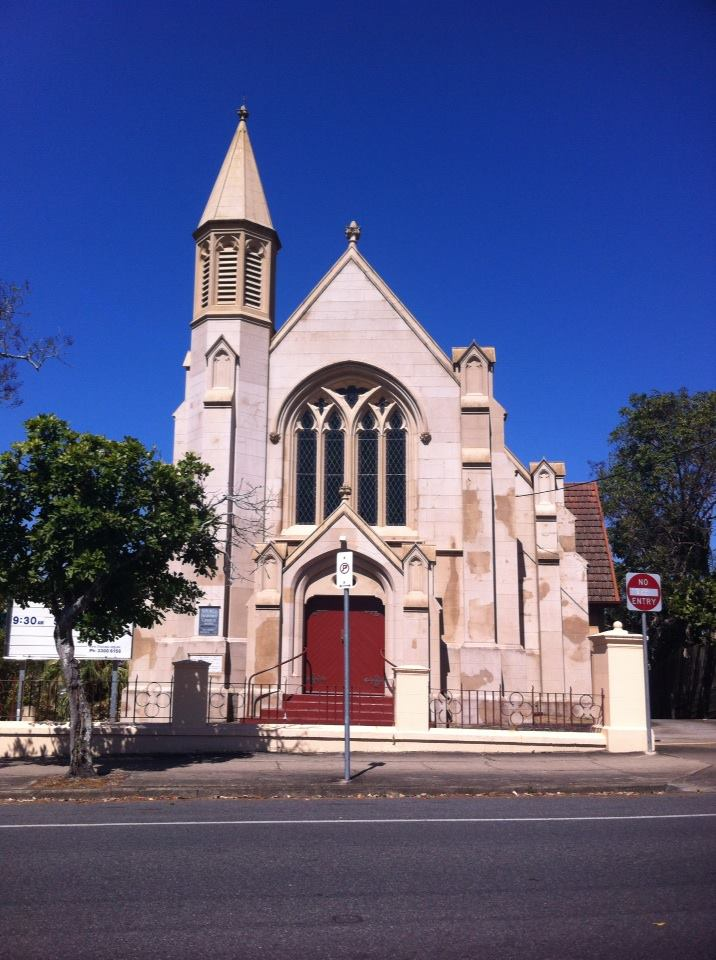
Front facade of the church

Ithaca Presbyterian Church is a heritage-listed church, located at 100 Enoggera Terrace, in the inner city suburb of Paddington, Brisbane, Queensland, Australia. The land was purchased in 1919 by the New Building Fund Committee of the Presbyterian Church, who collected £8000 for the church's construction. The design was commissioned to leading architectural firm Wilson Architects, who were renowned members of Brisbane's Presbyterian community. Construction commenced in 1927 and the building was formally dedicated and opened on Saturday February 9, 1929.

== Building ==
Like many early Brisbane churches, the Ithaca Presbyterian church is a well-known landmark situated on a hill overlooking the surrounding suburbs. It is built in an early gothic style, which is characterized by its pointed archways, flying buttresses and a single turreted bell tower. It is constructed of red brick and rendered in a tinted sand, cement and lime plaster which gives a sandstone appearance. Ithaca Presbysterian also features a cruciform plan with two vestries at the rear of the church.

The warm interior of the church is indicative of the arts and crafts style that was made popular in Brisbane in the early 1900s. It features soaring timber arches, stained glass windows and handicraft detailing. Upon entry to the main vestibule, rows of simple timber pews create two aisles that culminate in an apsidal end, which houses the pulpit, organ and vestries. As shown by the architect's plan, the pulpit projects outward into the congregation. This feature reveals the architect's belief that ‘the word’ was paramount to the Presbyterian faith. The interior furnishings also include a roll of honour from World War 1 and leadlight windows inscribed with letters IHS ("in his service") in memory of members of the congregation who were lost in the war. Potential influences for this design of the interior were likely to be buildings such as the St. Andrews Presbyterian church, Brisbane built in on the corner of Ann and Creek Streets in 1905 which also employed a similar arts and crafts aesthetic through use of timber vaulting and handicraft details.

== Restorations ==
The Ithaca Presbyterian church is still utilised as a church to the present day. In 2009 the front facade and bell tower underwent re-rendering in order to restore the walls, which had been affected by water seepage. The restoration took place over four months at a cost of $100,000. Of this sum, the Brisbane City Council’s Heritage Incentive Scheme contributed fifteen percent. The rendering was carried out using traditional materials and techniques in order to restore the building to its original appearance and also preserve the structural integrity against further weather damage.

== Heritage listing ==
The church has been listed on the Brisbane Heritage Register.
