= Marguerite Linton Glentworth =

American novelist

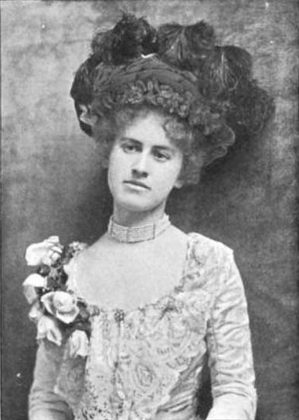
Marguerite Linton Glentworth

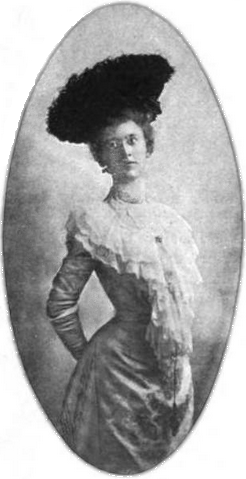

Marguerite Linton Glentworth (pen name, Gladys Dudley Hamilton; January 18, 1882 in Newark, New Jersey – September 2, 1956) was an American author.

== Biography ==
Glentworth was the daughter of James Linton and Caroline Elizabeth Glentworth. She was a granddaughter of Dr. George Glentworth, a Philadelphia surgeon and co-founder of the College of Physicians of Philadelphia, and on her mother's side is descended from James Budden, who commanded George Washington's bodyguard at the Battle of Brandywine. She was educated at private schools.

Glentworth began writing as child, and first attracted attention by Gates Ajar, a poem published when she was 14, and which gained the attention of Oliver Wendell Holmes Sr., Jean Ingelow, Frank R. Stockton, and critics in England and America. She was the author of A Twentieth Century Boy, 1901; The Tenth Commandment, 1902 (dramatized, 1905); and another novel. She was chair of the New York Woman's Press Club, as well as an active member of the American Playgoers and New Century Study Circle. In 1914 she was at the deathbed of the publishing tycoon Miriam Leslie.
