= Paddington, Queensland =

Paddington
- Suburb
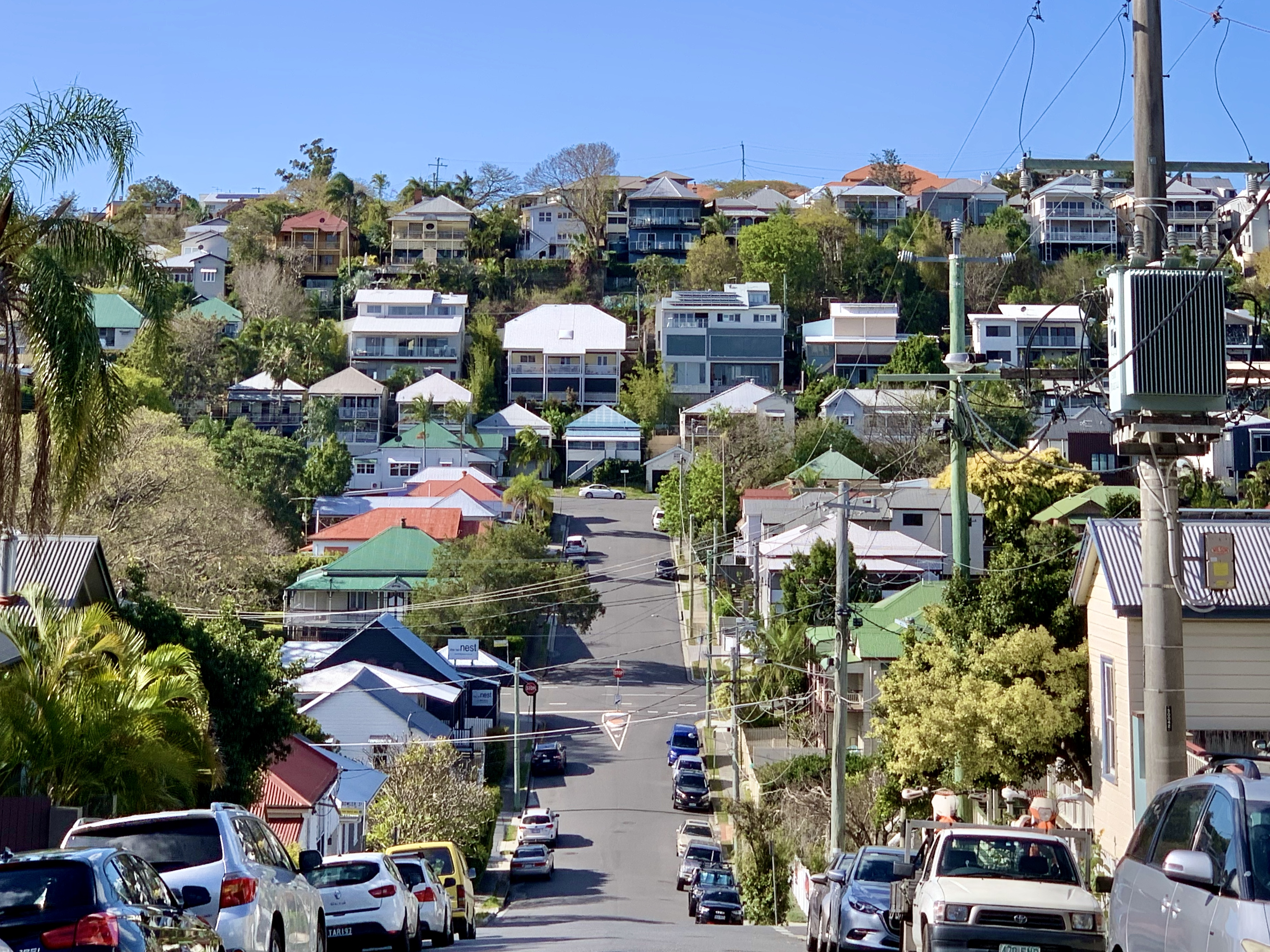
- Martha Street, Paddington

- Interactive map of Paddington
- Coordinates: 27.4594°S 153.0011°E
- Country: Australia
- State: Queensland
- City: Brisbane
- LGA: City of Brisbane (Paddington Ward)
- Location: 4.6 km (2.9 mi) WNW of Brisbane CBD

Government
  - State electorates: Cooper; Maiwar
  - Federal divisions: Brisbane; Ryan

Area
  - Total: 2.5 km^{2} (0.97 sq mi)

Population
  - Total: 9,063 (2021 census)
  - Density: 3,630/km^{2} (9,390/sq mi)
- Time zone: UTC+10:00 (AEST)
- Postcode: 4064
Suburbs around Paddington
Bardon	Red Hill	Red Hill
Bardon	Paddington	Petrie Terrace
Auchenflower	Milton	Milton

Paddington is an inner-western suburb in the City of Brisbane, Queensland, Australia, located about 4.6 kilometres (2.9 mi) west of the Brisbane CBD. At the 2021 census, Paddington had a population of 9,063 people.

Set across steep ridges and hills, the suburb is noted for its distinctive Queenslander houses, many dating from the late nineteenth and early twentieth centuries. Paddington includes the neighbourhood of Rosalie, which has its centre at the junction of Baroona Road and Nash Street (27.4661°S 152.9969°E) and was a separate suburb until 1975.

Paddington is one of Brisbane's most famed suburbs noted for its hilly streets and heritage architecture. It has been frequently the subject of artists including William Bustard, Roy Parkinson, and Jon Molvig, as well as contemporary artists and photographers such as William Robinson and Richard Stringer. The areas of Given and Latrobe Terraces and Rosalie village is best known for boutique shopping, cafés, galleries, and dining.

== Geography ==
Paddington lies in a valley in the foothills of Mount Coot-tha. The area is extremely hilly with many peaks and gullies. Most of the retail is located along the ridgetops which contain the main roads of Given Terrace and Latrobe Terrace. Given Terrace commences near Suncorp Stadium and rises to the west (colloquially referred to as "lower Paddington"). At the junction of Latrobe Terrace and Given Terrace, Given Terrace turns south-west downhill towards Rosalie on the left while on the right there is a steep drop to a gully which then rises again to the Red Hill ridge. The Latrobe Terrace is colloquially known as "upper Paddington" with the road sticking to the ridgetop with gentle slopes on either side until moving uphill towards the suburb of Bardon.

The suburb is predominantly residential, on small blocks of land by Queensland standards, with many workers cottages and Queenslander-style homes with corrugated iron roofs. Paddington includes the small locality of Rosalie. The suburb of Petrie Terrace lies to the east.

Ithaca Creek, which now largely exists in the suburb of Red Hill, runs down from the Taylor Mountain Range and Paddington originally developed around a series of water holes that ran from the Creek to the Brisbane River.

== History ==
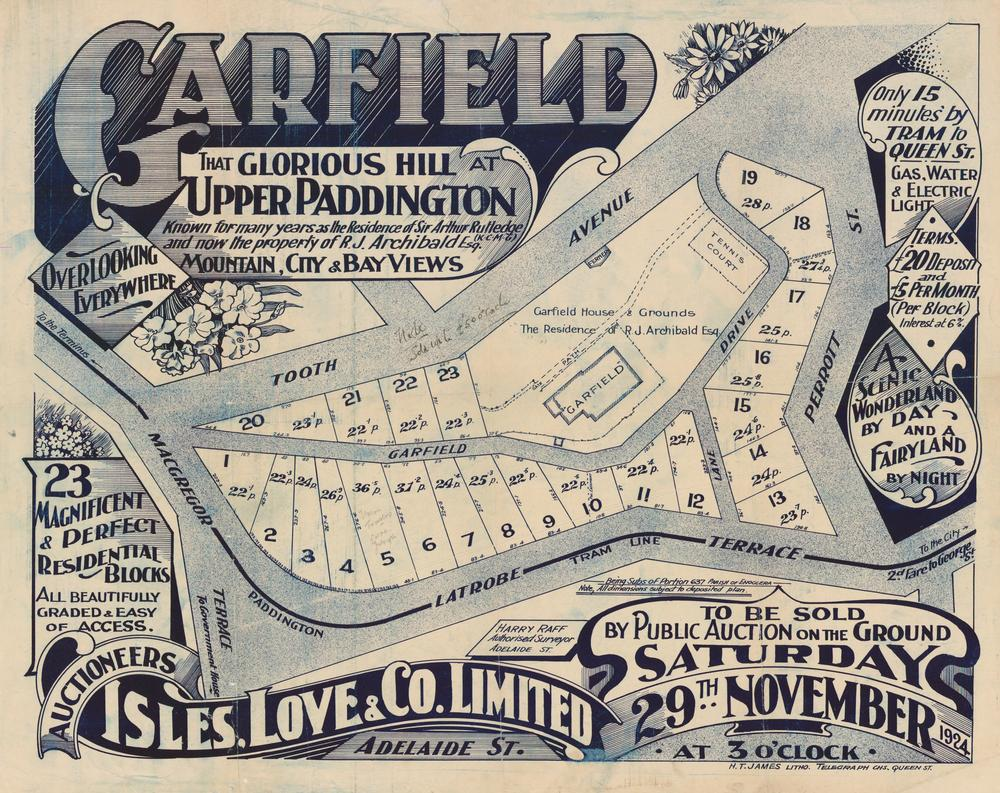
Real estate map of the Garfield Estate, 1924

The wooded slopes and ridges were home to the Turrbal, known by British settlers as the Duke of York's clan. In the early days Aborigines camped in Armstrong's Paddock on what is now Armstrong Terrace and also on the former Paddington Tram Depot on Enoggera Terrace.

=== British settlement ===
British settlement in Paddington commenced in the 1850s and the area was known as "Ti-Tree Flats" as the first residents moved there to cultivate gardens on the flats and to cut timber. The first sale of land occurred in 1859 with the sale of fifty-five lots. The name Paddington comes from the name of the farm of Mr B, Clay who named his farm after his London birthplace of Paddington. The Paddington farm was sold and subdivided in 1864.

Petrie Terrace State School opened in March 1868 with separate sections for boys and girls. In 1875 the school was split into Petrie Terrace Boys State School and Petrie Terrace Girls and Infants State School. In 1953 there was another re-arrangement resulting in Petrie Terrace Infants State School for the younger children and Petrie Terrace State School for the older children. In 1960 Petrie Terrace Infants State School closed and the Infants were transferred to Petrie Terrace State School.

A Primitive Methodist Church opened at 244 Given Terrace circa June 1877. In 1906, a new church building was erected on the site at 238 Given Terrace with the old church building moved to one side to become the church hall. The 1906 church was burned down in 1996. Some brick fencing from the church remains on the site, now occupied by modern commercial buildings.

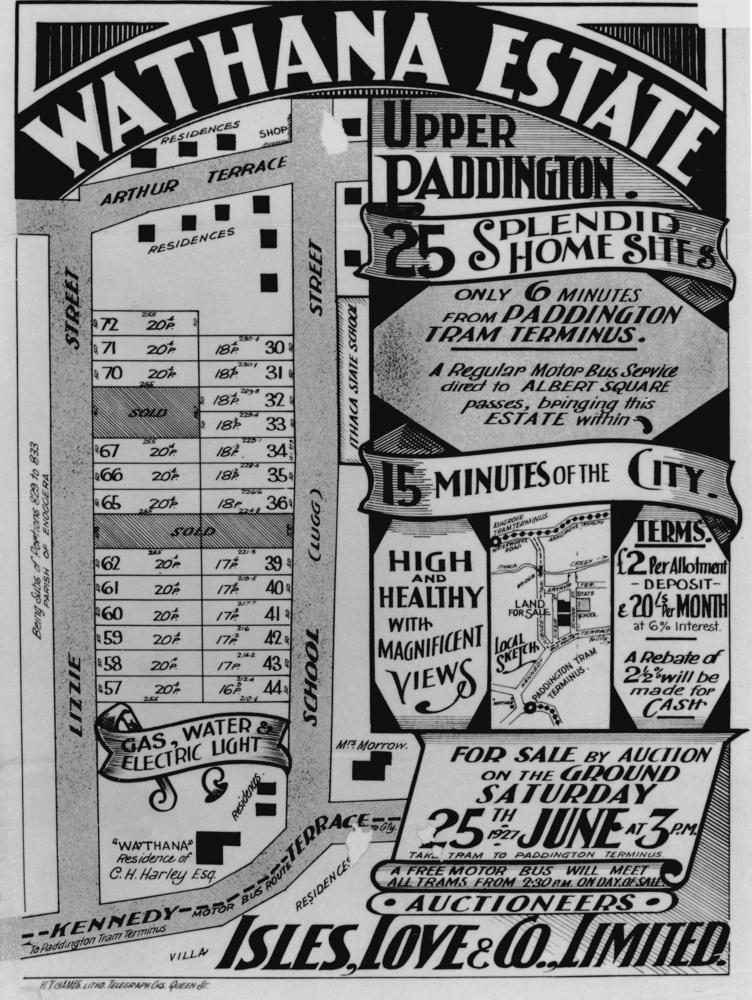
Land Sale map of the Wathana Estate in Paddington, 1927

Paddington was in the local government area of Ithaca Division from 1879 to 1887, then Shire of Ithaca from 1887 to 1903, and then Town of Ithaca from 1903 to 1925, after which Ithaca was amalgamated into the present City of Brisbane.

The Morris family owned and operated the boot and footwear factory on the corner of Hale and Caxton Streets from the 1880s until it was sold in the 1960s. The second factory building was built in 1930 and the F.T. Morris Footwear company employed up to 180 workers and could make 630 pairs of boots and shoes a day. The company was sold in the 1960s to Dixon & Sons and while the business continued to make a profit for a while bit eventually could not compete with cheaper imports and nylon and canvas mass-produced shoes. The factory closed in 1973. The second factory building in Caxton Street was reopened in 1976 as the "Spaghetti Emporium" restaurant, complete with a giant boot on the roof. In the 1980s, the building became the nightclub "Brisbane Underground" but it was demolished for the controversial Hale Street city by-pass in 1990.

The Brisbane Tramways Company, a private enterprise formed in 1895, introduced the first electric trams to Brisbane in mid-1897. Following lobbying by the Ithaca Shire Council, a tramway was extended along Musgrave Road to Red Hill, and a line was laid along Caxton Street and Given Terrace as far as Latrobe Terrace in 1898. By 1906-7 electric trams ran along Caxton Street and the Paddington line was extended until it reached Bardon in 1937. The Red Hill line was extended to Ashgrove in 1924. The tramways substation was erected in 1929–30 at the corner of Latrobe and Enoggera Terraces.

In 1898, the Roman Catholic Archbishop Robert Dunne purchased land on the corner of Given Terrace and Fernberg Road, Rosalie (27.4633°S 152.9993°E), to build a Catholic church called Sacred Heart at a cost of £500. It was part of the parish of Red Hill and Father Hegarty, parish priest of Red Hill, celebrated the first Mass.

=== The 1900s ===
Sacred Heart Parish School was opened in 1906 in a building beside the church and was operated by the Sisters of Mercy. It closed on 12 November 1995 due to the changing demographics of the area reducing the number of children wanting Catholic education.

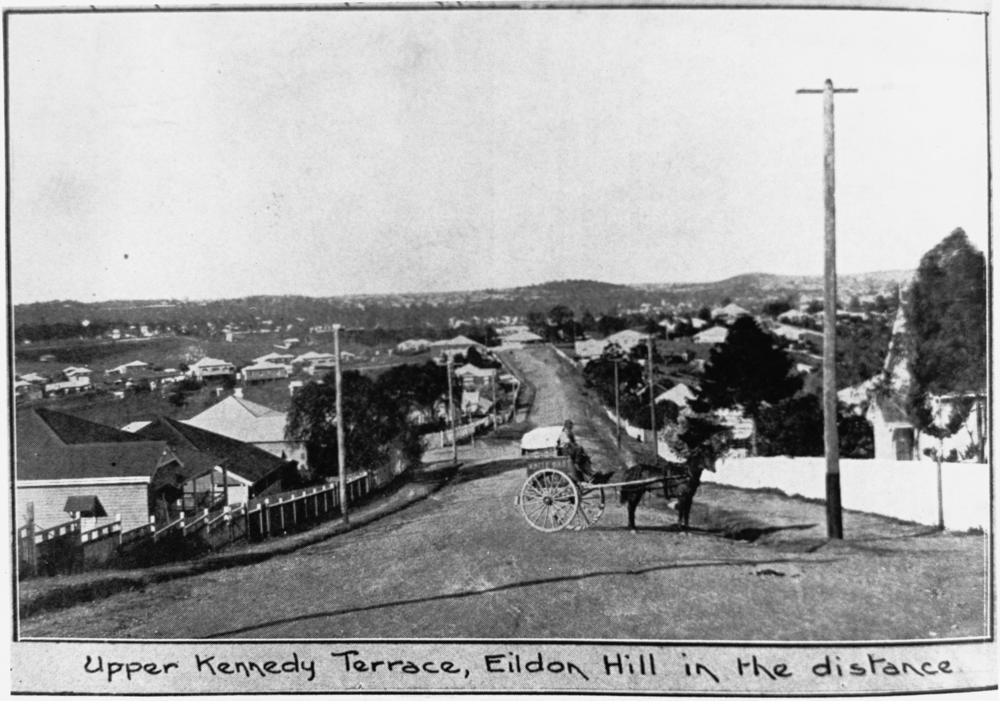
Looking along Kennedy Terrace, Paddington, Brisbane, 1921

On 25 February 1922, Sir Matthew Nathan, the Governor of Queensland unveiled the Ithaca War Memorial (27.4585°S 153.0006°E) to commemorate local people who had died in World War I.

Prior to 1925, the suburb was administered by the Ithaca Town Council. In that year the council was amalgamated with 24 other councils to form the Brisbane City Council.

In 1927, the water tower at Garfield Terrace was opened. At the opening the President said it had always been the aim of the Water Board to afford facilities to provide a full water supply to all residents on elevated land. For a time the area was referred to as Paddington Heights, supposedly to differentiate it from the more traditional working class Paddington.

Archbishop James Duhig wanted to establish a monastery and school in Rosalie for the Marist Brothers. On 29 July 1928, the foundation stone was laid by B. Catteneo at a site opposite the church on Fernberg Road (27.4638°S 152.9992°E). Building work was completed in time for Marist Brothers College Rosalie to open on 28 January 1929 with an initial enrolment of 135 boys. The school was officially opened on 20 February 1929 by Archbishop Duhig. The monastery was also used as a boarding school until 1940. On Sunday 6 June 1948 the foundation stone for the new Brothers school building was laid by Duhg accompanied by Éamon de Valera, who was travelling around Australia to speak and associate with the many Irish immigrants who had made Australia their home, at the end of his term of office of Taoiseach (Prime Minister) of Ireland. De Valera's visit was controversial given his role in the Irish War of Independence against the British Government and there was reluctance to hold civic receptions in his honour. Nonetheless, a crowd of nearly 2.000 people attended the laying of the foundation stone including the Labor Premier of Queensland (and staunch Catholic and local resident) Ned Hanlon and the Works Minister, Bill Power. At the ceremony at Rosalie, de Valera said "...the new school was part of the evidence of the magnificent works of charity and community effort that he had seen in every capital of the Commonwealth." On 2 October 1949 Duhig formally opened the new school building which had cost £35,000. The school closed in 2008 despite considerable protests from families currently and formerly associated with the school.

In the early 1960s, Lord Mayor Clem Jones of the Labor Party embarked on an ambitious programme to "sewer" Brisbane and within five years all the residences were sewered. Occasionally "outhouses" can still be seen in back yards. Following on from that over the next 10 years or so bitumen was laid to the sides of all roads. Bitumen used to extend to curbs only on the main roads.

Until December 1968, electric trams, operated first by the Brisbane Tramways Company and later the Brisbane City Council, operated along all four main thoroughfares in the suburb. A tram depot (garage) was located on Latrobe Terrace between 1915 and 1962, when it was destroyed in one of Brisbane's largest fires. The cause of the Paddington tram depot fire is not known however arson and public corruption has been rumoured for years. Sixty-five of Brisbane's trams were destroyed which was a large proportion of its fleet. After the fire Old Dreadnought trams were pressed into service, and eight replacement (Phoenix) trams were built, but Lord Mayor Clem Jones began to close lines almost immediately. The destruction of the depot is generally seen as the beginning of the end for Brisbane's tram system, providing the justification for the subsequent closure of four tram routes, the gradual encroachment of bus operation on other tram routes with the final closure of the tram system occurring on 13 April 1969.

The 1974 Brisbane flood which ravaged much of Brisbane largely left Paddington proper alone. The main roads and shops of Paddington were on the ridge tops and it was only the houses in the gullies and dips that were affected.

In 1975, the suburb of Rosalie was merged into Paddington with Rosalie being accorded neighbourhood status within Rosalie.

== Demographics ==
In the 2011 census, the population of Paddington was 7,987, 52.2% female and 47.8% male. The median age of the Paddington population was 32 years of age, 5 years below the Australian median. 73.6% of people living in Paddington were born in Australia, compared to the national average of 69.8%; the next most common countries of birth were England 4.5%, New Zealand 3.5%, Ireland 1.1%, United States of America 1%, South Africa 0.9%. 86% of people spoke only English at home; the next most common languages were 1.3% Italian, 0.8% German, 0.8% French, 0.8% Spanish, 0.5% Mandarin.

In the 2016 census, Paddington had a population of 8,562 people.

In the 2021 census, Paddington had a population of 9,063 people.

== Culture ==
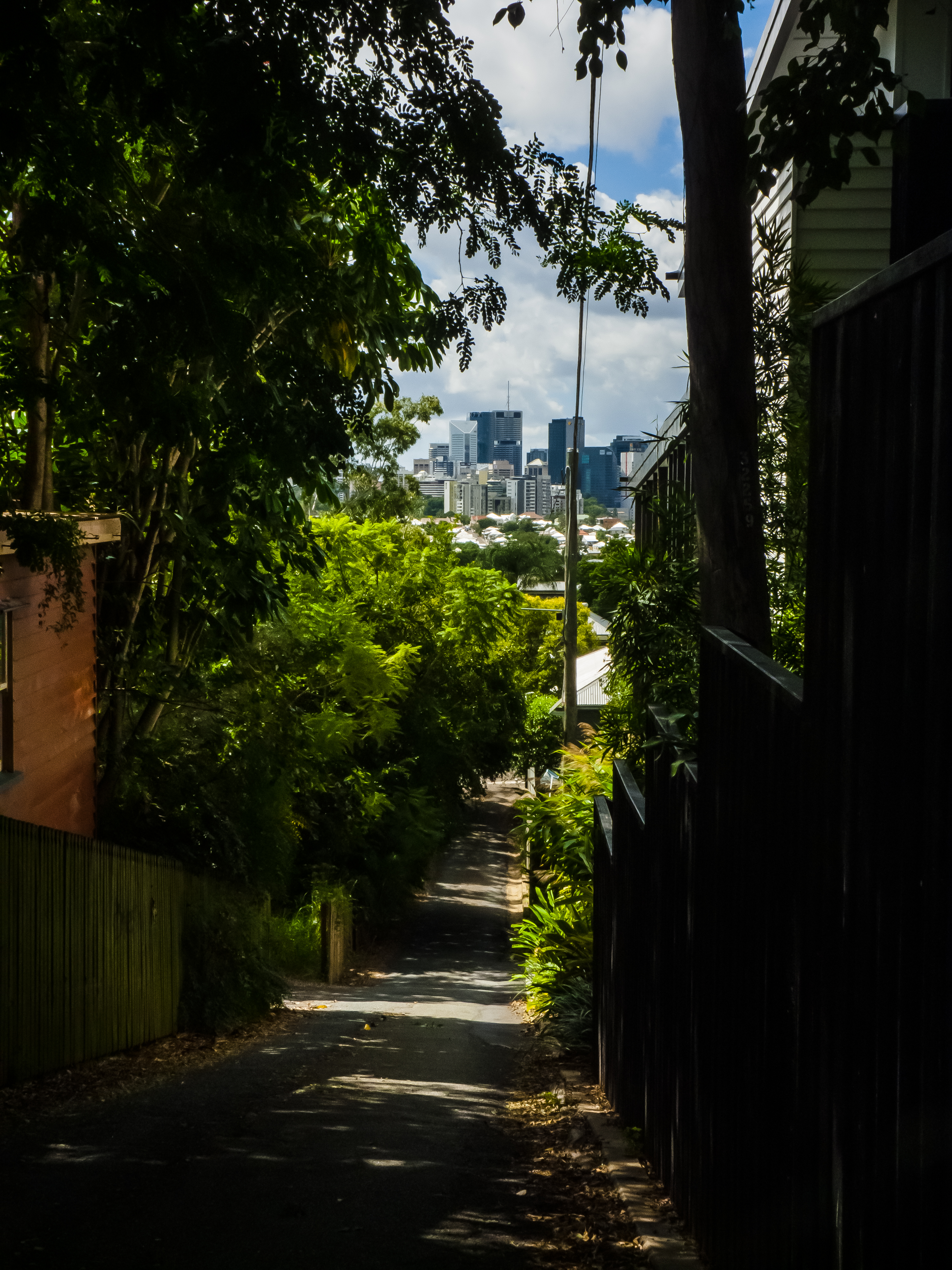
Narrow leafy streets from Enoggera Terrace

The low cost of the area also meant that young people and students moved to the area and brought their own "do it yourself" entertainment with them. By 1976, various members of the punk band "The Saints" lived in a share house in Petrie Terrace and even created a club there, "Club 76". In January 1977, the Saints celebrated the release of the album and the cover picture (and subsequent video clip) was taken down the road from Club '76 in an abandoned terrace house.

The Caxton Street Hall (which since has been the Velvet Cigar strip club and is now Lefty's Old Time Music Hall) was also a notorious live venue which hosted gigs by "The Saints", "The Go-Betweens", "The X-Men", "Died Pretty", "Xero", The Black Assassins, les Bon Bons, Razar and others as did the Lang Park Leagues Club. The general mood of the time was captured by The Saints in their song "Brisbane (Security City)"(1978).

The most notorious gig at the Caxton was on 30 November 1979 following a gig by local punk band "The Sharks". As the crowd came out onto the footpath, police waded in and began arresting patrons. 12 teenagers were arrested and assaulted on the footpath and back and at the police watch house.

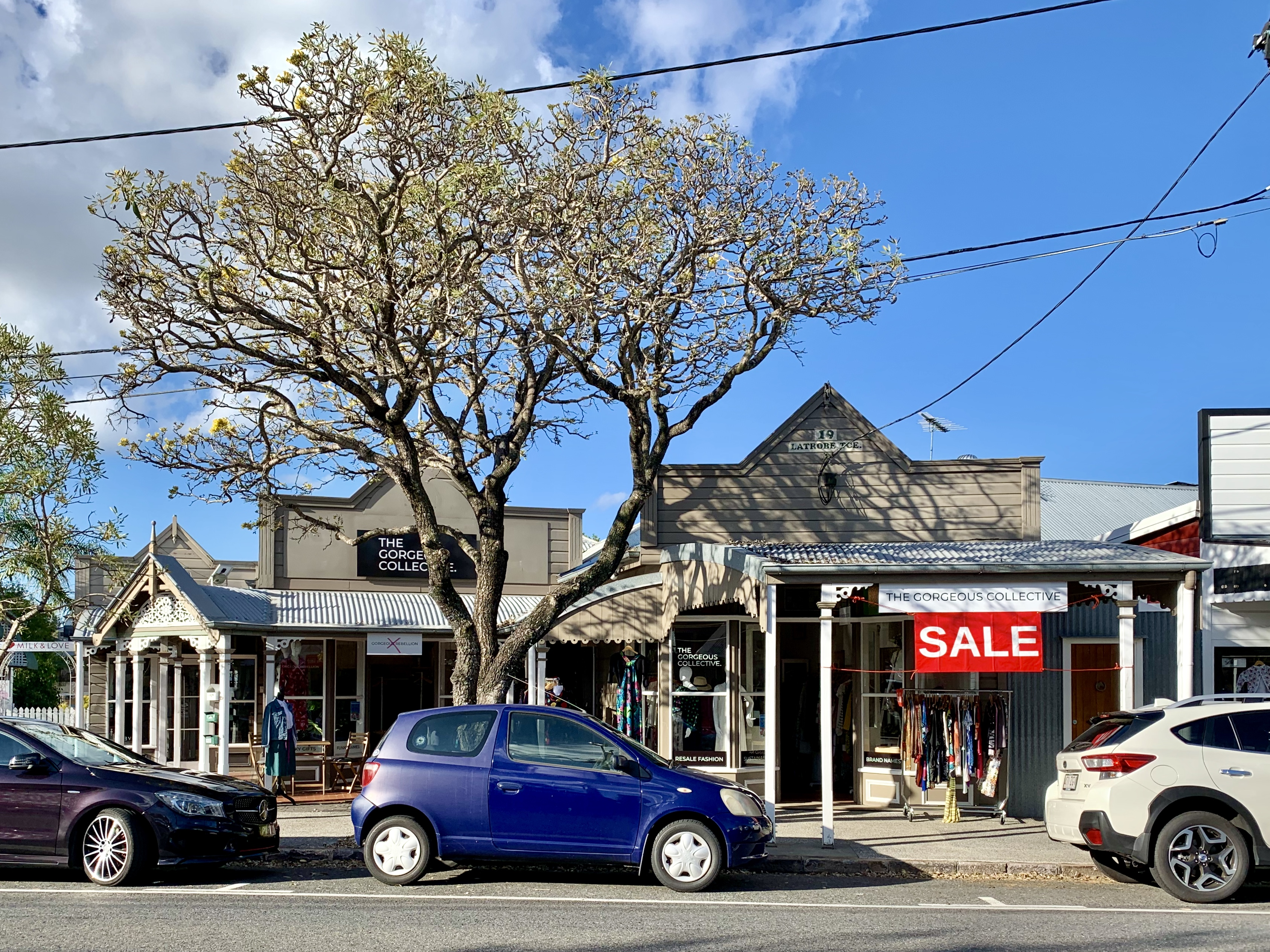
Latrobe Terrace, Paddington

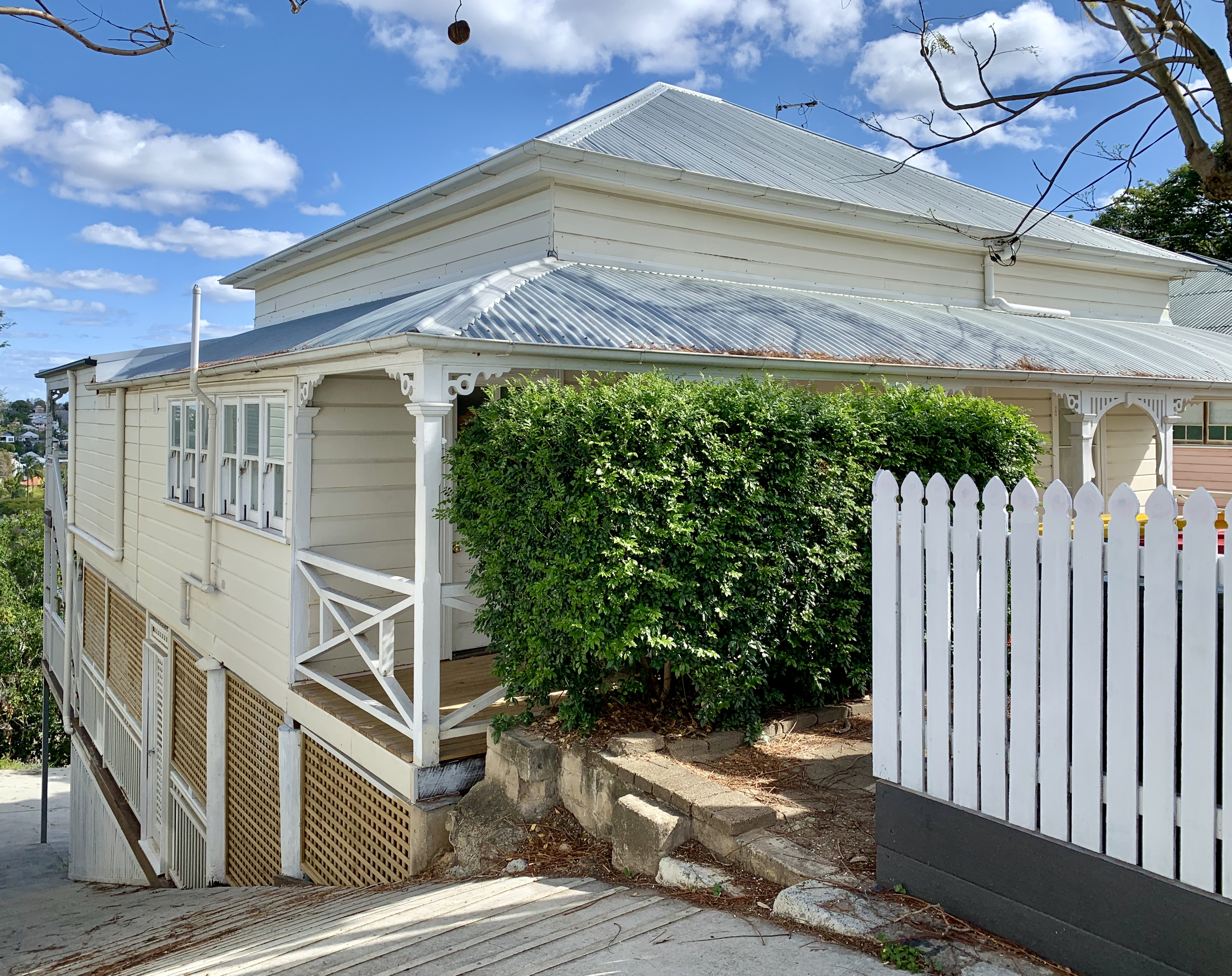
House on stilts along Latrobe Terrace

== Transport ==
By road: the main thoroughfares of Paddington are Given, Latrobe and Enoggera Terraces. Most shops are located on Given and Latrobe Terraces.

By bus: Buses operated by Transport for Brisbane serve the suburb. And in conditions free of traffic congestion, a bus trip from the Brisbane CBD takes around ten minutes to upper Paddington.

== Amenities ==
Senior citizens are catered for by the Brisbane West Senior Citizens Club at 132 Latrobe Terrace which host activities and respite services for senior citizens.

The Centre for Multicultural Pastoral Care at 333 Given Terrace which was originally established in 1949 and provides pastoral care for post World War II immigrants from traditionally Catholic countries.

The smaller localities of Rosalie and Torwood also has a thriving restaurant, café, and gourmet culture along Baroona Road which also hosts an annual Cheese Festival and where art house cinema can be viewed at the Blue Room Cinebar.

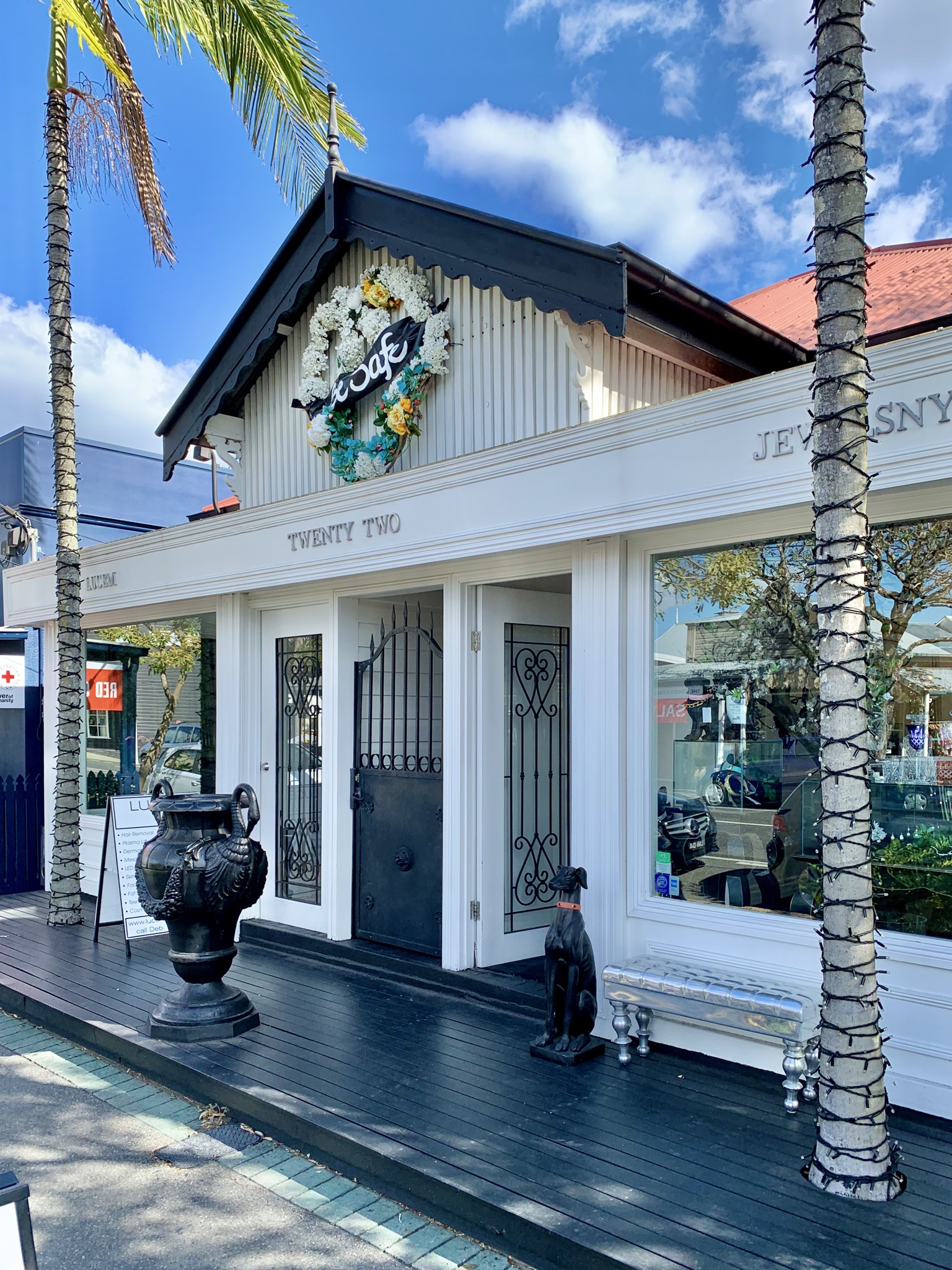
Latrobe Terrace, Paddington

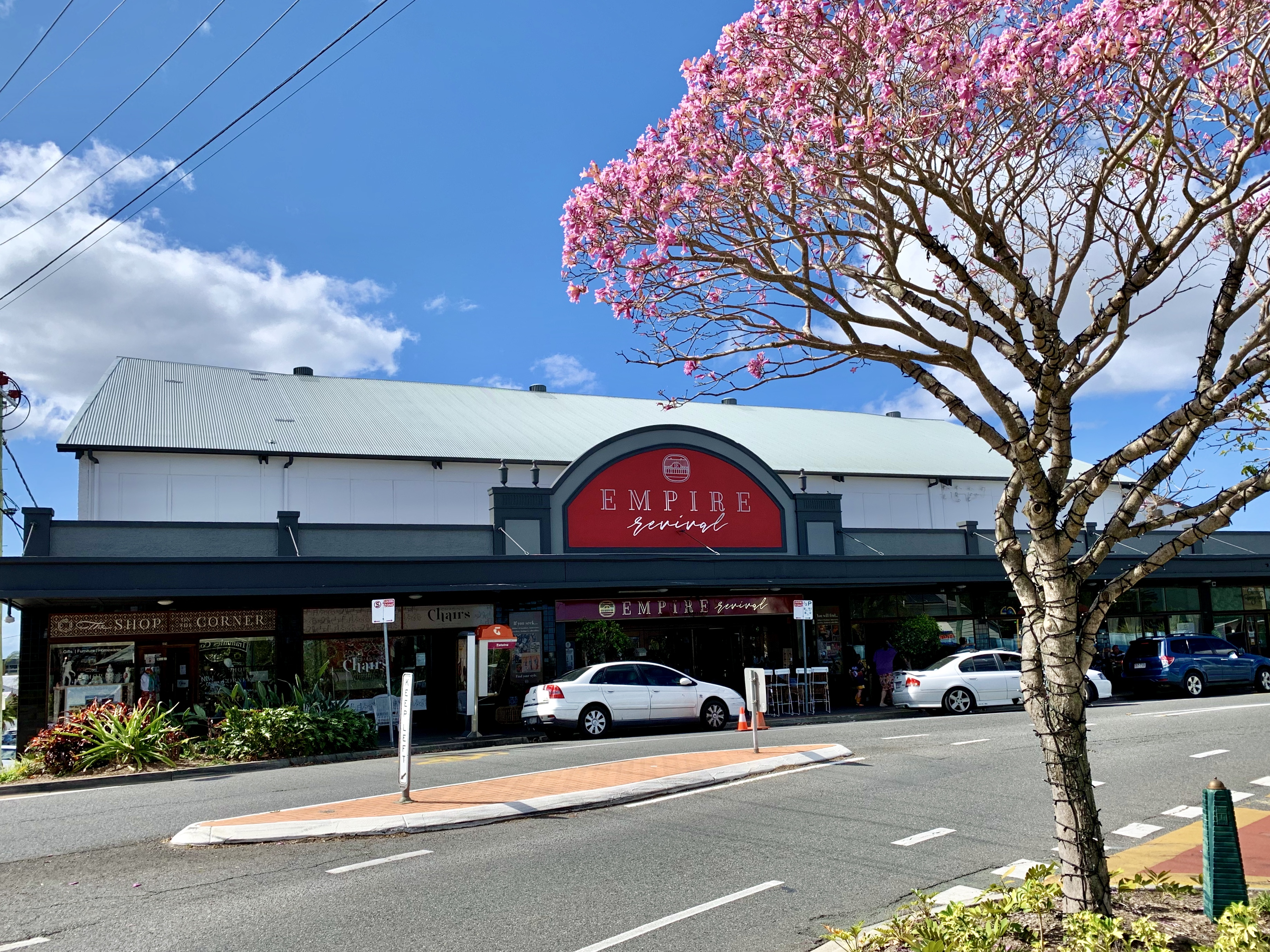
Paddington Antique Centre

Paddington Central is a shopping centre at 107 Latrobe Terrace. It was originally the site of the Paddington Tram Depot, which was destroyed in a fire in 1962.

== Churches ==
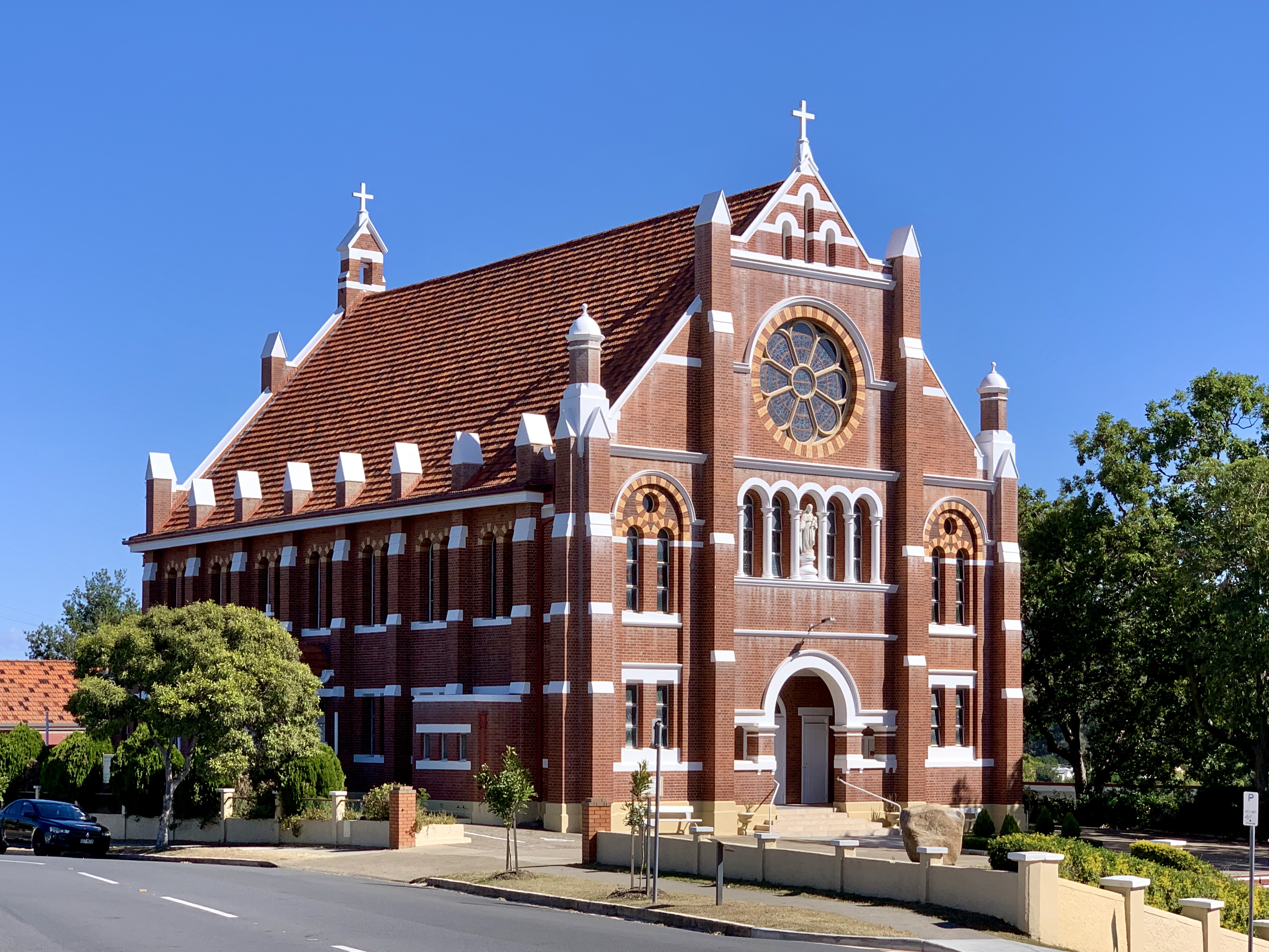
Sacred Heart Catholic Church, Paddington

There are a number of churches in Paddington proper including two Catholic and one Presbyterian Church. The Catholic parish of Jubilee has its parish headquarters on Given Terrace. The churches are located at:

- Sacred Heart Catholic Church, 355 Given Terrace, Paddington.
- St Thomas More Catholic Church, 111 Hale Street, Petrie Terrace, with mass in Italian.
- Enoggera Presbyterian Church Building, 100 Enoggera Terrace, Paddington.

There are a further three Catholic churches in adjoining suburbs, a number of small Catholic Chapels, an Anglican church (in Milton, based at St Francis College on the historic Bishopbourne site), a Baptist church, and a Uniting Church. The nearest cemetery is the nearby Brisbane General Cemetery at Toowong (locally known as Toowong Cemetery) which is the largest cemetery in Brisbane though it is largely closed.

== Education ==
Petrie Terrace State School is a government primary (Prep–6) school for boys and girls at 40 Moreton Street (27.4599°S 153.0096°E). It is nestled below St Brigid's Church, Red Hill and behind the fig trees near the Ithaca Swimming Pool. In 2017, the school had an enrolment of 234 students with 20 teachers (15 full-time equivalent) and 18 non-teaching staff (9 full-time equivalent). It includes a special education program.

Schools in nearby suburbs also supply primary education to children in Paddington, including Ithaca Creek State School to the north in Bardon, Rainworth State School also in Bardon to the west, and Milton State School in Milton to the south.

There are no secondary schools in Paddington. The nearest government secondary school is Kelvin Grove State College.

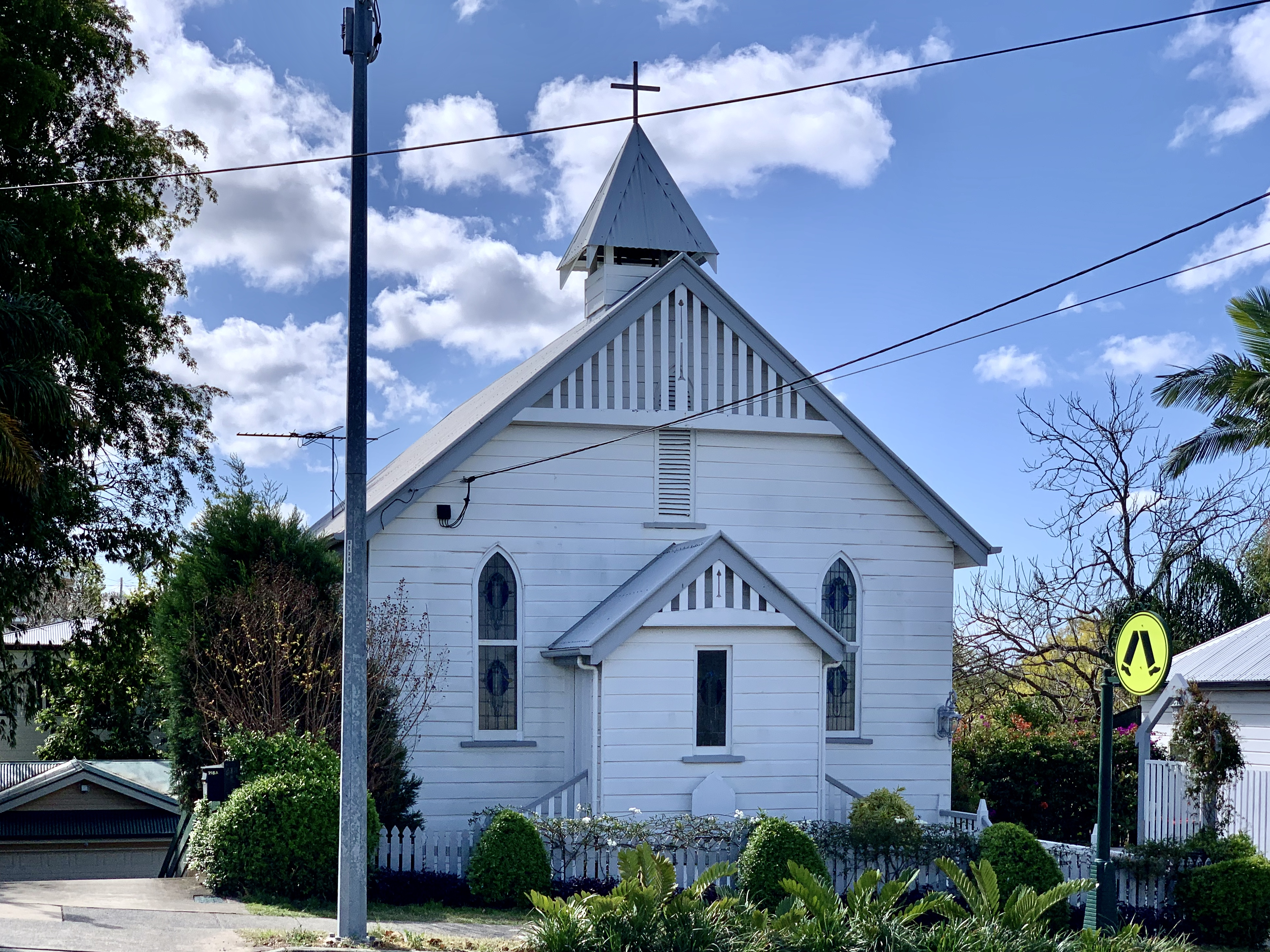
Latrobe Chapel, Paddington

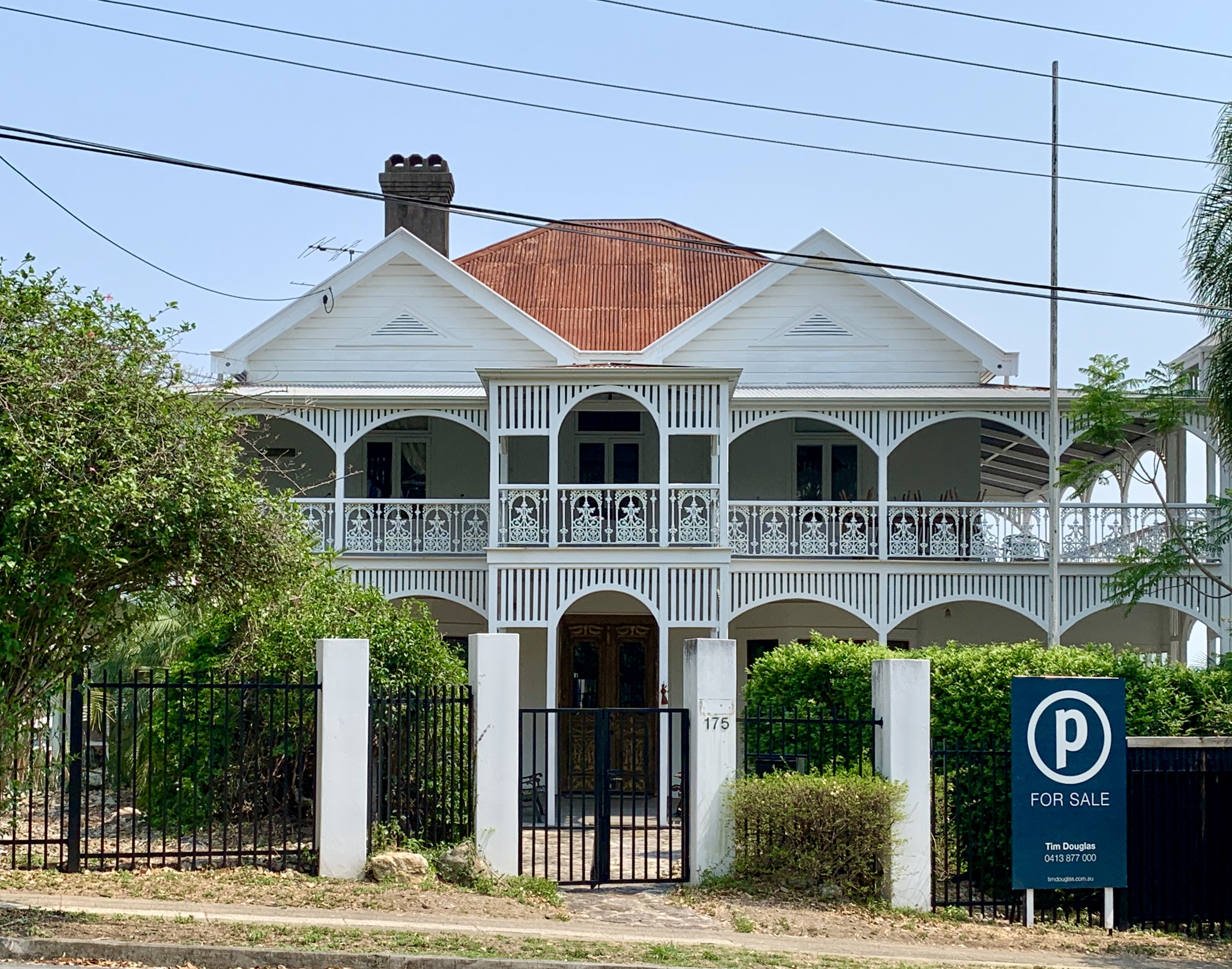
Typical Paddington Queenslander style detached house

== Heritage listings ==
Paddington has a number of heritage-listed sites, including:

- Neal Macrossan Playground, 14 Caroline Street
- Rosalie RSL Hall, 50 Elizabeth Street
- Rosalie Community Kindergarten and Preschool, 57 Elizabeth Street
- Ithaca War Memorial, Enoggera Terrace
- former Ithaca Fire Station, 140 Enoggera Terrace
- Paddington Tramways Substation, 150 Enoggera Terrace
- Marist Brothers College Rosalie Buildings, Fernberg Road
- Lucerne, 23 Fernberg Road
- Government House, 170 Fernberg Road
- Paddington Water Tower, 16 Garfield Drive
- Glenworth, 34 Howard Street
- Boondah, 50 Howard Street
- Baroona, 90 Howard Street
- Foresters' Hall, 16 Latrobe Terrace
- Paddington Antiques Centre, 163–169 Latrobe Terrace

== Notable buildings ==
The majority of notable non-residential buildings exist in the area, notably along Caxton Street, Given Terrace, Latrobe Terrace and Enoggera Terrace.

=== Given Terrace ===
- The Hanlon shops at 216–228 Given Terrace, which are "terraced" styled shops with accommodation above formerly owned by the family of Pat Hanlon, who was the brother to Premier Ned Hanlon. The building was originally constructed in the 1880s and has been modified since however the original structure is still visible.
- The old Uniting Church at 234–244 Given Terrace was sold to private interests in the 1980s and burnt down in 1996 after development proposals were rejected by the Brisbane City Council (a fate that was to befall the Red Hill Roller Skating rink). The wooden building was built in 1906 to accommodate the new congregation of the merged local Wesleyan and Primitive Methodist churches. The building was designed specifically for the triangular block and the new commercial and residential building largely reflects the shape of the original building. The only remaining feature of the Church are the brick retaining walls facing Given Terrace.
- The old Sheard's Bakery at 265–267 Given Terrace. Constructed around 1888 it was a bakery for many years before being sold and converted into a shop and then restaurant.
- The Kookaburra Café at 280 Given Terrace. Built around 1888 the building stands on land once owned by a person using the name Louis Le Gould who claimed he was the son of a French General who was Aide-de-camp to Napoleon Bonaparte. Le Gould was a licensed surveyor who was an unsuccessful candidate for alderman in November 1863, a local newspaper calling him pseudo-Gallic, lacking honour and reputable conduct.
- The former Paddington Post Office on 293 Given Terrace at the corner of Latrobe Terrace, is a classic example of a Type T15 Federation Timber design, built in 1900. These commercial buildings feature a gable in the facade, including vent; veranda / porch with near flat roof, columns span the front with a balustrade around the porch and a large lantern vent centrally place in the roof.
- The Sisters of Mercy Sacred Heart Convent at 327 Given Terrace, Paddington built in 1917. The building is representative of the Federation Queen Anne style in the timber detailing and asymmetrical façade. It is a good typical of the design of convents throughout Australia, which were built as prominent and substantial buildings, and were designed with the chapel within, often expressed as a projecting bay. The convent was designed by the architect T. R. Hall who designed other buildings for the Catholic Church including Our Lady of Victories, Bowen Hills, in partnership with GG Prentice. Hall designed other prominent buildings during this partnership, including the city hall, McDonnell and East building and the travel centre of New South Wales. The building is in private ownership though is heritage listed.
- The Sacred Heart Church, Rosalie, at 358 Given Terrace, is a large Catholic church which was opened on 16 June 1918 and designed by prominent architect G. M. Addison. The church has a single-manual mechanical action organ was originally installed by J. W. Walker & Sons of London in 1885 and it is fully enclosed. It suffered damage by fire in 1942. In 1982 restoration was undertaken by H. W. Jarrott of Brisbane. The building is heritage listed
- The old Ashton butchers building at 7–9 Latrobe Terrace (now a private business). Originally built in 1888 it housed Ashton's Butchers until the 1910s when it was taken over by the government and became the State Butchery.
- Foresters' Hall, at 16 Latrobe Terrace (now a St Vincent de Paul "Vinnies" opportunity Shop). This timber hall was built between June and September in 1888 for the Trustees of Court Foresters' Hope, number 6535 of the Ancient Order of Foresters' Friendly Society, United Brisbane District and demonstrates a way of life during the late nineteenth and early twentieth centuries when friendly societies, which provided a welfare service by means of mutual aid, were a prominent and expanding part of Queensland society. The friendly societies came to Australia as part of the British philosophy of self-help and mutual aid which became prevalent during the industrial revolution. The building is also of interest for its legacy as part of the 1880s development boom which transformed Paddington from a semi-rural area into a commuter suburb of Brisbane. The Paddington Foresters' Hall had a seating capacity of 320 people and provided a thriving community service to the growing population of Paddington as a hall which could be let to the public for meetings including local Rechabites, the Salvation Army, the Ithaca Ratepayers Association, the Women's Christian Charity and the Theodore Unmack Society of Masons, the local Labour Party. In 1996, the hall was purchased by the present owners and Vinnies, an opportunity shop run by the Order of St Vincent de Paul, is there now.
- The former Salvation Army Hall at 29 Latrobe Terrace (now Endeavour Opportunity Shop). The hall was built in 1897 and the "Army" played a vital role in providing relief during the various depressions. Its presence in the area reflects the former working class area of the suburb. The building was sold to private owners in the 1970s.
- The former Paddington Plaza Theatre on 153–171 Latrobe Terrace (now the Paddington Antique Centre) is a traditional example of the 1930s movie house. It is a large and imposing timber building with rendered brickwork at either end and an awning which protrudes from the facade. The roof is gabled and constructed of corrugated iron. The building has been little modified internally and the main area is a large rectangular space with a vaulted plaster ceiling. The building is important in illustrating the pattern of development of suburban cinemas in Brisbane, and in illustrating the evolution of cinemas in Queensland, during the interwar years of the 20th century. It is important also in illustrating the pattern of development of the Paddington district. The building was erected circa 1929 by Brisbane contractor John Hutchinson [later J Hutchinson & Sons] for Greater Brisbane Motion Pictures Ltd and probably designed by Brisbane architect Richard Gailey jnr, the Plaza is a rare early 20th century 'atmospheric' theatre in Queensland. This ceiling was painted a vibrant blue and stars used to twinkle and backlit clouds and a moon moved across the sky on tracks. The blue paint is still apparent and some of the clouds still exist as does the proscenium which is constructed of plaster and features ornate plaster work. The term "atmospheric" denotes a picture theatre with an interior décor that simulated an exotic outdoor setting. Atmospheric cinemas were popularised in Australia in the late 1920s and early 1930s after the architect for Sydney-based Union Theatres, Henry White, travelled to the United States to study picture theatre design. Shortly after construction commenced, the Hutchinson family acquired both the building and the land, commencing a long association with the theatre. In 1929 the Plaza Theatre faced strong competition from at least two rival picture shows in the Paddington-Red Hill district: Stephens New Paddington Theatre on Given Terrace [c1924] (which was demolished in the early 1980s to make the Paddington Centre) and Red Hill Picture Pops on Enoggera Terrace [c1920] (which became the Red Hill Roller Skating rink and "mysteriously" burnt down following a development proposal in the early 2000s). Although the Plaza was by no means the first picture theatre in the Paddington district, it was the most ornate, erected in a third wave of picture theatre construction which swept Brisbane suburbs in the late 1920s and 1930s. The picture theatre was open seven days a week, with serials shown on Monday and Tuesday nights, films and newsreels on other nights, and a matinee programme on Sunday afternoons. On Saturdays, trams reputedly would stop outside the theatre at opening time and wait until the film finished to take patrons home again. Popular films attracted audiences of around 1200, for the movies appealed to all ages. A special soundproofed glass room, called the 'cry room', was provided for young mothers and their babies. The Plaza theatre also hosted dances and balls mainly for the local school of Marist Brothers Rosalie. The theatre operated successfully until television was introduced to Brisbane in the late 1950s, by which time Plaza audiences were reduced to 20–30 patrons per screening (though the auditorium in 1960 contained seating for 932 persons). In 1961 the Plaza Theatre ceased to operate as a cinema and a level floor was installed and the building was used for indoor basketball until a court case instigated by a neighbour who complained of the noise. The plaza remained mostly vacant until 1974 and was sold in 1977. It now houses an antiques retailing centre. The shops fronting Latrobe Terrace are still occupied by a variety of tenants, and the complex is still the focus of a small nodal shopping centre. The Plaza Theatre (Paddington Antique Centre) complex now includes a series of small retail shops on either side of the foyer entrance.
- The Ithaca Embankments on Latrobe Terrace below the Ithaca War memorial on first blush appear to be nothing more than a cut away into the side of a hill. They however are important in demonstrating the principal characteristics of the Ithaca Town Council's early 20th century street beautification projects, being some of the best surviving examples, and provide important surviving evidence of stone retaining wall and edging techniques practised by Brisbane's public landscape gardeners in the early 20th century, which were influential on civic landscaping throughout Queensland and Australia.

=== Enoggera Terrace ===
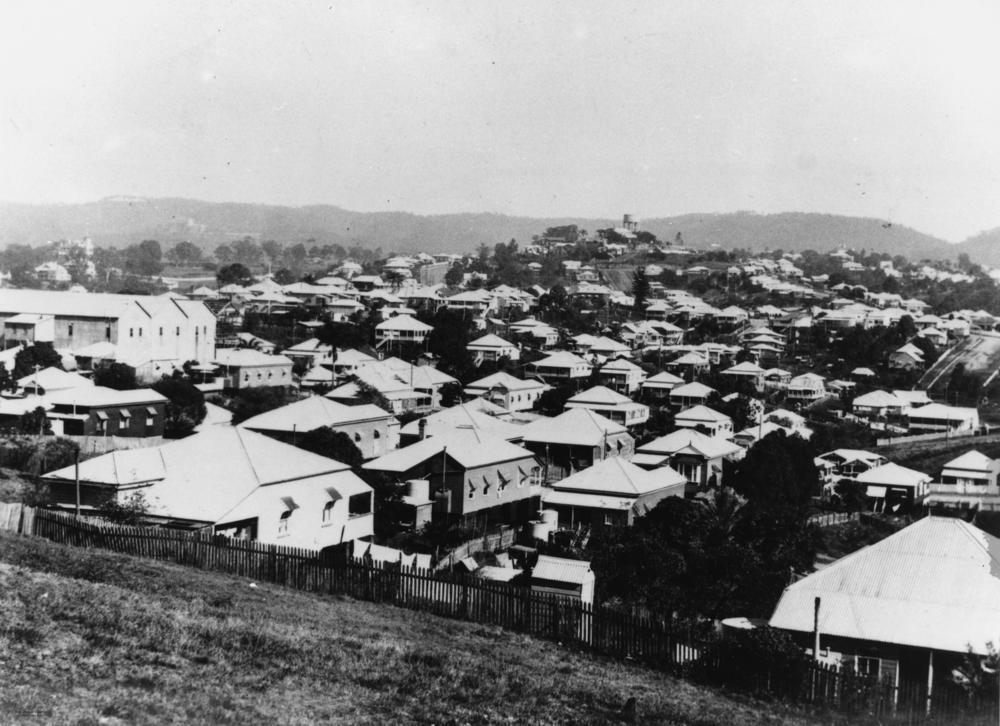
View of Paddington in 1929, taken from Enoggera Terrace looking towards Latrobe Terrace.

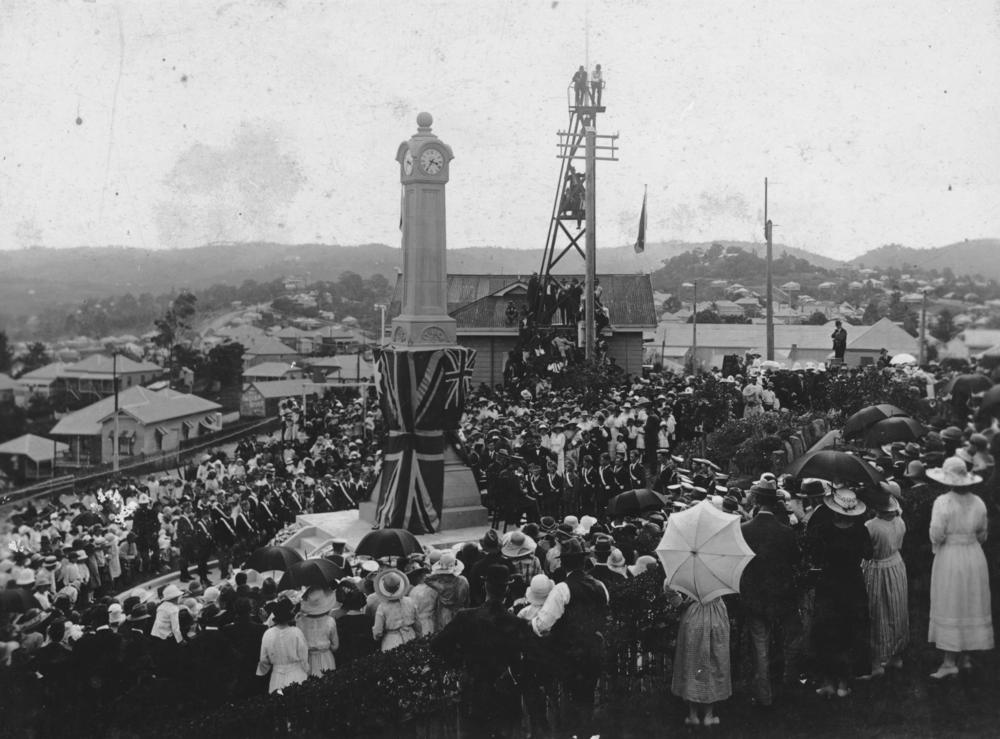
Unveiling of the Ithaca War Memorial, 1922

- Ithaca Presbyterian Church, 100 Enoggera Terrace, Paddington, built in 1928 and of the Interwar Gothic style with the use of simple Gothic details such as the pointed entrance arch and simple tracery to the windows and entrance. The building is heritage listed.
- The distinctive Paddington Substation at 150 Enoggera Terrace erected in 1929-30 during a period of tramways expansion which followed the Brisbane City Council's 1925 acquisition of the tramways system from the Brisbane Tramways Trust. It was erected on Cook's Hill, along the Paddington line, on land which was formerly part of the adjacent Ithaca Fire Station. The function of the Paddington substation, was to assist the Petrie Terrace substation (erected 1927–28) in providing a better distribution of power to the increased western suburbs tram services from the powerhouse at New Farm. The Paddington substation, constructed of bricks and structural steel from the old Countess Street power house which closed in mid-1928, was the first of his substation designs to incorporate a parapet wall, flat roof and exterior render. The substation commenced operation on 11 August 1930 and remained in service until the phasing out of Brisbane's trams in the late 1960s. In 1969 the Paddington line was closed, the substation's electrical equipment was removed, and the building became a storage depot and subsequently an art space and art centre.
- The former Ithaca Fire Station, at 140 Enoggera Terrace, constructed in two stages, 1918–19 and 1928, is an excellent example of "between the wars" Queensland civic architecture. The place is an integral member of an historic group on Cook's Hill which includes the adjacent Ithaca War Memorial and Park, The Paddington Substation, and Ithaca Embankments. The brigade was formed in 1918 by the merger of the Ithaca and Milton Volunteer Fire Brigades, and provided the inner western suburbs with a permanent fire fighting force of four, with six auxiliary staff. It was closed down in the early 1980s.
- The Ithaca War Memorial located on a parcel of land sandwiched between Enoggera and Latrobe Terraces on Cooks Hill and erected circa 1922. The memorial at Ithaca demonstrates the principal characteristics of a commemorative structure erected as an enduring record of a major historical event but also is rare as an early example of the clock tower type of memorial in the Brisbane area. The memorial provides evidence of an era of widespread Australian patriotism and nationalism, particularly during and following the First World War and memorial services are still held there every year on Anzac day. The stone memorial honours the 130 local men who died on active service during the First World War. The small park surrounding the memorial also has special associations with landscape gardener Alexander Jolly as one of the few remaining examples of his work, and with monumental masonry firm AH Thurlow. Much of the impetus for the work came from Ithaca Town Council's landscape gardener, Alexander Jolly, (father of the first Mayor of Greater Brisbane, William Jolly), who was a horticultural enthusiast and whose lifetime of gardening experience transformed the Ithaca townscape in the period c1915-25. Some of Jolly's more prominent projects included the rockeries along Musgrave and Waterworks Roads; the landscaping of Cook's Hill; and the Ithaca War Memorial garden, which, after his death, was named Alexander Jolly Park, in memory of one of the most esteemed men in the district, and as a unique tribute to the pick and shovel. Only small sections of the Waterworks Road rockeries remain, and most of the Cook's Hill garden was destroyed when the Paddington Tramways Substation was erected in 1929–30.

=== Others ===
- Government House at 168 Fernberg Road in upper Paddington and is the official residence of the governor of Queensland and has been since 1911. The main house, built in 1865 and originally known as Fernberg there were extensive additions in the 1880s. The building is the only remaining substantial residence and villa estate, of almost original proportions, in Brisbane from the 1860s and with the later additions is regarded among the finest examples of a Victorian Italianate villa in Brisbane. The building was originally built by businessman Johann Christian Heussler who is believed to have given his home "Fernberg" a name of German origin that meant "distant mountain". The property was sold to businessmen George and Nathan Cohen in 1878 and then to various other businessmen before finally being bought by the State Government in 1911.
- The Marist Brothers Monastery, Fernberg Road, Rosalie. The building is heritage listed.
- Paddington Water Tower at 16 Garfield Drive (on what is known as Archibald's Hill) is an elevated reinforced concrete water tank on Paddington's highest point which can be seen from miles around. It is probably the only one of its type in Queensland being a reinforced concrete tank elevated on concrete columns. The tank's height from the highest point is 70 feet (21 metres) and the tank has a capacity of 100,000 gallons (.38 megalitre) though it is not in use at present. It is important in demonstrating a phase in the history of Brisbane's water supply and the technological difficulties of providing reticulated water to elevated sites. It was constructed for a cost of £12,000 and completed in 1927.
- The La Boite building which formerly housed the "La Boite Theatre Group" at Hale Street, Milton. The building was Australia's first purpose-built, 200 seat theatre in the round (designed by architect Blair Wilson). The award-winning "modernist" building became an iconic and much loved Brisbane theatrical landmark. The La Boite officially opened on Sunday 4 June 1972 and hosted many plays, both mainstream and controversial before relocating in 2003 to the more sterile State sponsored Kelvin Grove Village. The building is occupied by Evans Harch builders.

== Notable residents ==
- Ned Hanlon (1887–1952) – railway worker, grocer and Premier of Queensland 1946–1952 was born in Paddington.
- Sir Arthur Morgan (1856–1916) – newspaper proprietor and "progressive" Premier of Queensland 1903–1906 lived in Paddington at the time of his death.
- Sir Kenneth Morris (1903–1978) – army officer, shoe/boot manufacturer, liberal/conservative politician, deputy premier of Queensland 1957–1962 was born in Paddington.
- Errol O'Neill (1945–2016) playwright, actor, writer, director, dramaturg and producer, specialising in the creation of new work for the theatre lived in Glanmire Street, Paddington for many years
- Gordon Olive (1916–1987) – Australian fighter ace in the Battle of Britain, World War II
- Paul Piticco – music and hospitality entrepreneur, grew up in the suburb and attended Petrie Terrace State School.
- The band The End lived in Paddington and played at the Caxton Street Hall in 1981, before transforming into the band Died Pretty.

== Cultural references ==
- "THE PADDO BOYS – A baby boomer's journey through the Seventies" (Zeus Publications, 2017) by Peter Coman is a memoir, in part, about growing up in the Paddington working class milieu of the 1960s and 1970s.
- Paddington is the main setting of Bluey, a television series that debuted in 2018.
