= Baroona, Paddington =

Baroona
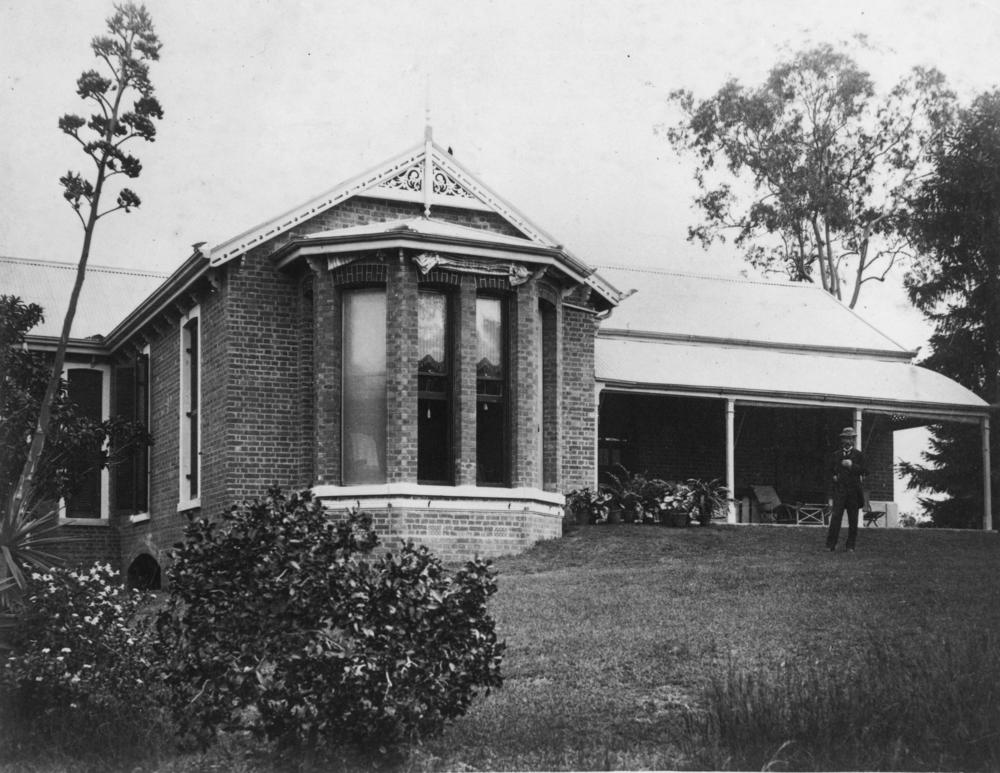
- Baroona, a residence in Paddington, Brisbane, 1886

- Location within Queensland Location within Australia
- 27.4675°S 152.9931°E
- Location: 90 Howard Street, Paddington, City of Brisbane, Queensland, Australia

History
- Design period: 1840s–1860s (mid-19th century)
- Built: c. 1866

Site notes
- Architect: Benjamin Backhouse

Queensland Heritage Register
- Official name: Baroona
- Type: state heritage (landscape, built)
- Designated: 21 October 1992
- Reference no.: 600289
- Significant period: 1860s–1880s (fabric, history)
- Significant components: garage, extension/s or addition/s, views from, tennis court, cellar, wall/s – retaining, garden/grounds, residential accommodation – main house

Baroona is a heritage-listed villa at 90 Howard Street, Paddington, City of Brisbane, Queensland, Australia. It was designed by Benjamin Backhouse and built c. 1886. It was added to the Queensland Heritage Register on 21 October 1992.

== History ==
The original residence, called Baroona, was designed by Benjamin Backhouse and built in 1866 for William Draper Box on land which the architect had alienated in 1861 and Box acquired in 1865. The property extended from Baroona Road on one side to the outskirts of Torwood on the other.

Box had arrived in Brisbane in 1862 to establish a Queensland branch of his father's mercantile firm, and lived at Baroona until 1885. He was a member of the Queensland Club and of the Queensland Legislative Council from 1874 until his death in 1904.

During subsequent years the house was rented by two prominent politicians. Hon. John Donaldson Member of the Queensland Legislative Assembly was in residence from about 1886 to 1889, followed by Sir Robert Philp of Burns Philp and Co, the Queensland Premier from 1899 to 1901. William Melbourne Watts, Land Commissioner, purchased the house in 1899 and sold it to Emily and Cornelius Geaney in 1919. Geaney was the City Mutual Life Insurance Company manager and his family retained the property until 1951 when Dr and Mrs Hill became the owners. It was sold again in 1984.

The building was extensively modified by successive owners including the addition of rooms, brick render, eastern verandahs, fretwork gable, northern porch and a modern kitchen.

The name Baroona is also used for the main road, the locality and the municipal ward.

== Description ==
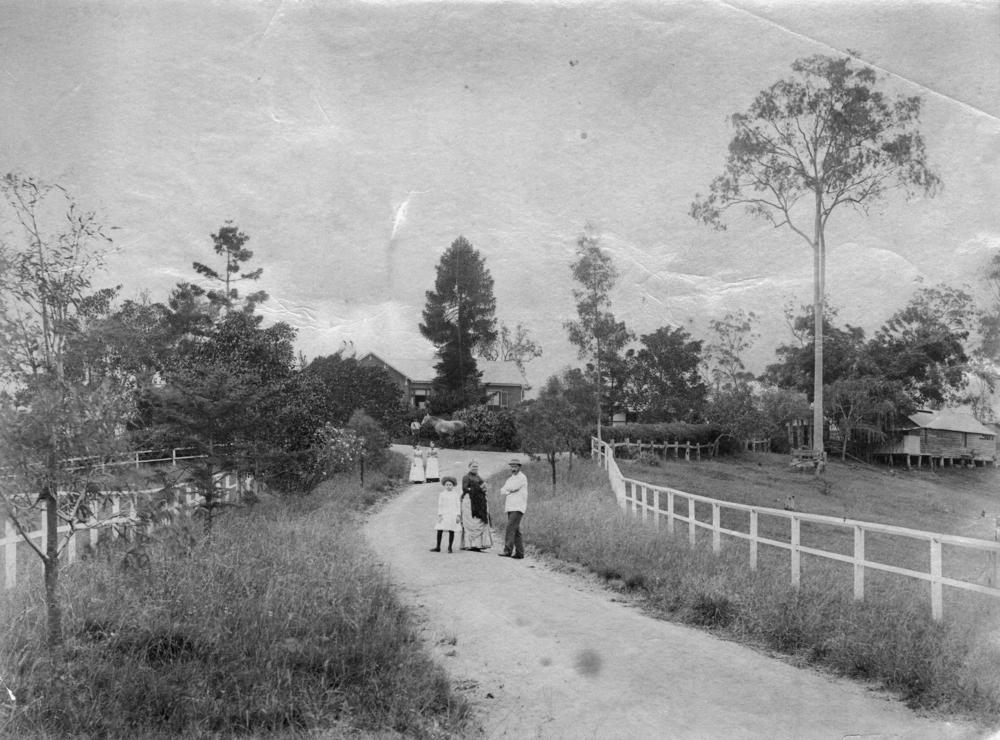
Driveway to Baroona, ca. 1885

Baroona is a single-storeyed rendered masonry building with a corrugated iron gabled roof. The building sits on a level hilltop site and has verandahs to the east and southeast, and to portions of the north and south elevations.

The gables have timber finials and decorative bargeboards with the eastern bay gable featuring timber fretwork. Verandahs have corrugated iron skillion roofs and the north verandah has an entrance porch with projecting gable.

The east and southeast verandahs sit on timber stumps and have latticed valance and cast iron balustrades. The south verandah has timber arches with lattice infill and opens off a hall with a corrugated iron barrel vault roof which is lined with tongue and groove boards. This vault has glazing to the western end and a central square raised skylight.

The building has sash windows and French doors open onto the verandahs with exposed windows having timber shutters. A brick cellar is located on the southern side, a carport is attached to the southwest and a separate rendered masonry garage with a corrugated iron gabled roof and decorative timber finials and bargeboards is located to the west.

The grounds include a lawn tennis court to the north, mature trees to the west and south and a stone embankment to the northeast.

== Heritage listing ==
Baroona was listed on the Queensland Heritage Register on 21 October 1992 having satisfied the following criteria.

The place is important in demonstrating the evolution or pattern of Queensland's history.

The association with Sir Robert Philp, Hon. John Donaldson and William Draper Box.

Community association with the name Baroona being used for the main road, the locality and the municipal ward.

Landmark value as the areas original house and its siting on the crest of the hill.

Evidence of the domestic work of Benjamin Backhouse.

The place is important because of its aesthetic significance.

Landmark value as the areas original house and its siting on the crest of the hill.

The place has a strong or special association with a particular community or cultural group for social, cultural or spiritual reasons.

Community association with the name Baroona being used for the main road, the locality and the municipal ward.

The place has a special association with the life or work of a particular person, group or organisation of importance in Queensland's history.

The association with Sir Robert Philp, Hon. John Donaldson and William Draper Box.

Evidence of the domestic work of B Backhouse.
