= Plaza Theatre, Paddington =

Plaza Theatre
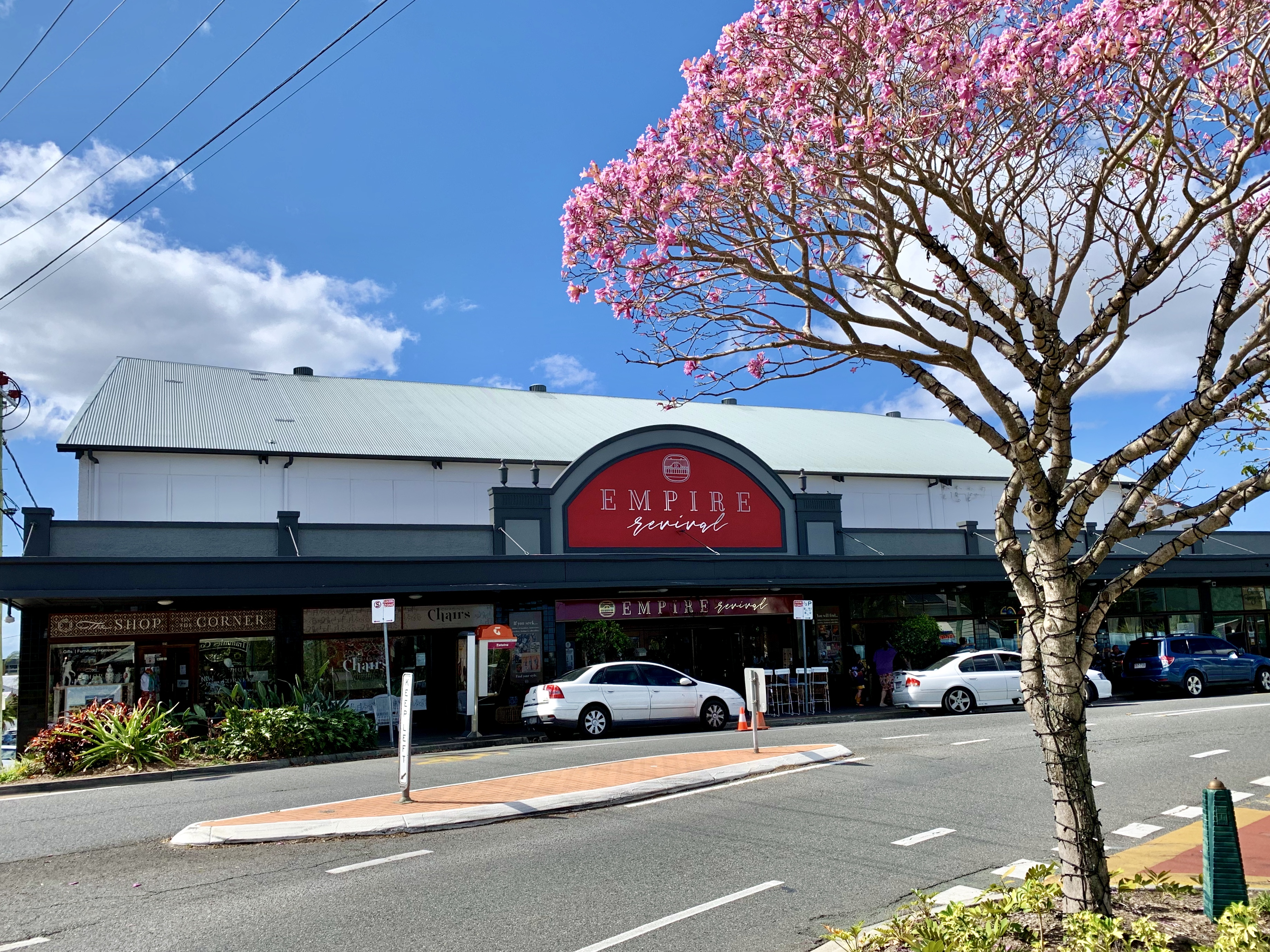
- Former Plaza Theatre, now antique shop, 2020

- Location within Queensland Location within Australia
- 27.4581°S 152.9948°E
- Location: 163–169 Latrobe Terrace, Paddington, Queensland, Australia

History
- Design period: 1919 to 1930s (interwar period)
- Built: 1929–c. 1929

Site notes
- Architect: Richard Gailey, Junior

Queensland Heritage Register
- Official name: Paddington Antiques Centre, Plaza Theatre
- Type: state heritage (built)
- Designated: 28 March 2003
- Reference no.: 601654
- Significant period: c. 1929 (fabric) c. 1929–1961 (historical, social)
- Significant components: shop/s, proscenium arch, foyer – entrance, auditorium, toilet block/earth closet/water closet
- Builders: John Hutchinson

Plaza Theatre is a heritage-listed, former cinema at 163–169 Latrobe Terrace, Paddington, Queensland, Australia. It was designed by Richard Gailey, Junior and built from 1929 to c. 1929 by John Hutchinson. It is now known as Empire Revival, an antiques and homewares store. It was added to the Queensland Heritage Register on 28 March 2003.

== History ==
The former Plaza Theatre at Paddington was erected c. 1929 by Brisbane contractor John Hutchinson (later J Hutchinson & Sons). Originally commissioned for Greater Brisbane Motion Pictures Ltd and probably designed by Brisbane architect Richard Gailey jnr, the Plaza is a rare early 20th century "atmospheric" theatre in Queensland. Shortly after construction commenced, the Hutchinson family acquired both the building and the land, commencing a long association with the theatre.

In 1929 application to Brisbane City Council was made by Greater Brisbane Motion Pictures Ltd of Brisbane for the construction of a new picture theatre at the corner of Collingwood Street and Latrobe Terrace, Paddington (allotments 9–13 of portion 757, parish of Enoggera), to cost £8,000. The architect was recorded as Richard Gailey jnr and the contractor was John Hutchinson. Plans were approved by 22 June 1929.

At the time of application, title to the land was still in the names of William Drynan (allots 9–10) and Georgina Blackwell (allots 11–13). Drynan's land was transferred to Queensland Talkie Pictures Ltd in December 1931, and following Mrs Blackwell's death in August 1931, allots 11–13 passed to the same company in November 1932. Also in November 1932, Queensland Talkie Pictures Ltd took out mortgages on all four allotments from John Hutchinson, who ultimately gained title to allotments 11–13 in 1941, and to allotments 9–10 in 1955. The Hutchinson family understand that before construction was completed, the exhibition company (which they refer to as Associated Pictures) became insolvent and ownership of the building also passed to the contractors.

In 1929 the Plaza Theatre faced strong competition from at least two rival picture shows in the Paddington-Red Hill district: Stephens New Paddington Theatre on Given Terrace (c. 1924) and Red Hill Picture Pops on Enoggera Terrace (c. 1920). Although the Plaza was by no means the first picture theatre in the Paddington district, it was the most ornate, erected in a third wave of picture theatre construction which swept Brisbane suburbs in the late 1920s and 1930s. The proliferation of small suburban picture shows through the 1920s, the introduction of the "talkies" (which necessitated considerable capital investment to acquire sound projection equipment), and the effects of the depression, combined to produce keen competition in suburban film exhibition. Suburban theatres of this period could no longer survive as the open-air venues of the 1910s or the tin sheds of the early 1920s — they had to offer the public something more than just the films. Theatres all over Brisbane either closed, or were remodelled or rebuilt along more substantial, more comfortable and more decorative lines, with the object of capturing local imagination and loyal attendance. Few suburban picture exhibitors, however, could afford to match the opulence of the central city theatres, such as Birch, Carroll and Coyle's Wintergarden Theatre (1923–24), or Hoyt's Regent Theatre (1929). At the time that Gailey is recorded in mid-1929 as the architect for the Plaza Theatre, he was also the Brisbane supervising architect for the opulent Regent Theatre in Queen Street, designed by Melbourne architect Charles N Hollinshed.

The Plaza at Paddington, with its painted blue ceiling resembling the night sky and side niches and painted barley-twist columns suggesting a Spanish courtyard, is the only Brisbane suburban picture theatre identified to date, which can be described as "atmospheric". The term denotes a picture theatre with an interior decor that simulated an exotic outdoor setting. Atmospheric cinemas were popularised in Australia in the late 1920s and early 1930s after the architect for Sydney-based Union Theatres, Henry White, travelled to the United States to study picture theatre design. He looked in particular at the work of American architect John Eberson, who specialised in atmospheric cinemas themed and appropriated from Byzantine, Persian, Spanish, Moorish and Egyptian architecture, which extended theatrical illusion from screen to venue. While the Paddington Plaza was not of the same scale and opulence as the great Australian atmospheric theatres such as Sydney's Capitol (1928 – seating capacity 2900), Perth's Ambassadors (1928 – seating 2000) and Melbourne's State (1929 – seating 3300), the design incorporated the essential elements of the "atmospheric", in that the interior decoration simulated an outdoor venue.

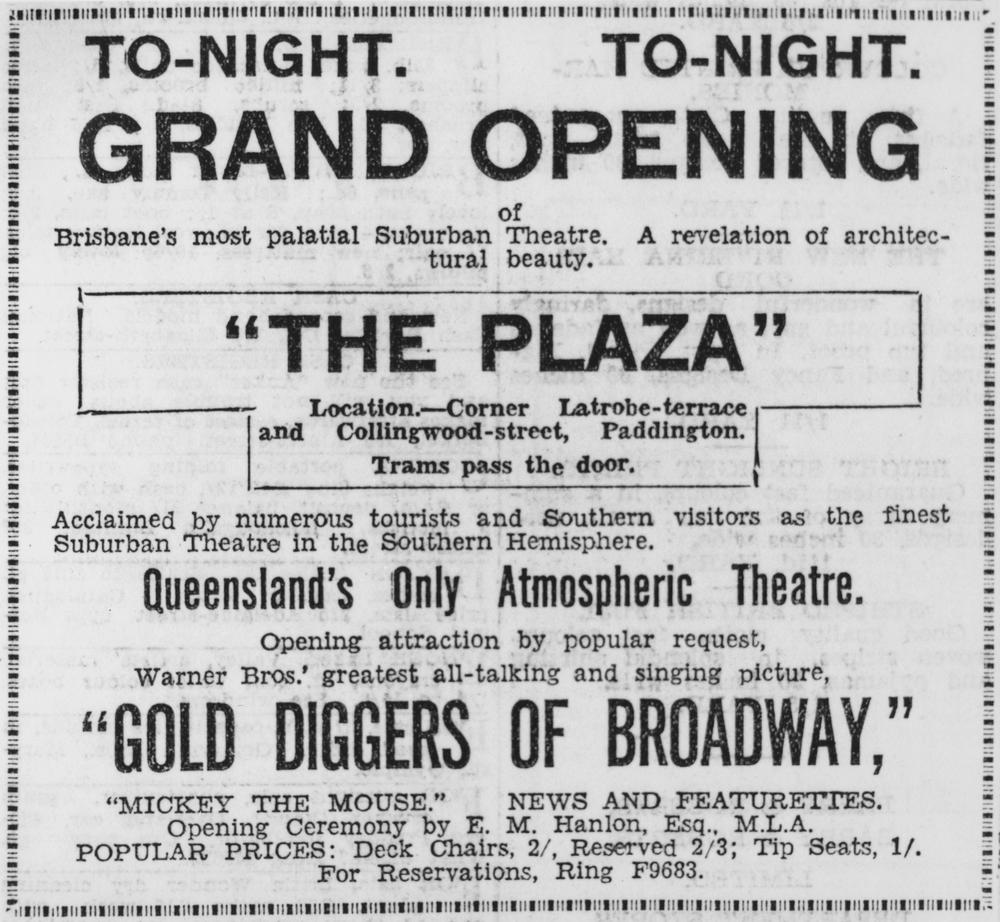
Advertisement for the grand opening of the Paddington Plaza Theatre, 28 August 1930

It is understood that the Plaza Theatre was designed initially to screen only silent film, but in 1929 synchronised sound and film was introduced to Australia and the Plaza opened as a "talkies" theatre. The seats (capacity 1250 in 1938) were arranged on a single-level raked floor. The Plaza Theatre came to be a popular meeting place for Paddington residents. It was open seven days a week, with serials shown on Monday and Tuesday nights, films and newsreels on other nights, and a matinee programme on Sunday afternoons. On Saturdays, trams reputedly would stop outside the theatre at opening time and wait until the film finished to take patrons home again. Popular films attracted audiences of around 1200, for the movies appealed to all ages. A special soundproofed glass room, called the "cry room", was provided for young mothers and their babies.

The Plaza Theatre complex included a group of eight shops/offices fronting Latrobe Terrace either side of the entrance foyer. These premises were occupied soon after completion, and for many years lessees included Harold Louitt's chemist shop (1930–69), a dressmaker, a grocer and a milkbar. After the movies patrons congregated at the milkbar, which retained its original fittings until refurbished in 1994.

The theatre operated successfully until television was introduced to Brisbane in the late 1950s, by which time Plaza audiences were reduced to 20–30 patrons per screening, in an auditorium which by 1960 contained seating for 932 persons. In 1961 the Plaza Theatre ceased to operate as a cinema. A level floor was installed and the building was used for indoor basketball. In 1968 this activity ceased following a court case instigated by a neighbour who complained of the noise. The Plaza remained mostly vacant until 1974 when Hutchinsons moved their offices from West End into the foyer. In 1975 the company underwent a major restructure and moved to new premises. Hutchinsons sold the theatre in 1977 and it currently houses an antiques retailing centre. The shops fronting Latrobe Terrace are still occupied by a variety of tenants, and the complex is still the focus of a small nodal shopping centre.

== Description ==
The former Plaza Theatre is a large and imposing shed-like building prominently located at a bend in the road on Latrobe Terrace in Paddington. Its end walls are constructed of load-bearing masonry that have been rendered in roughcast stucco and the gable roof is clad in corrugated galvanised iron. The gable ends and upper sections of the north wall are finished in fibro-cement sheeting with the lower north wall constructed of concrete with buttresses.

The street facade of the building is a series of shops with a deep awning supported by iron tie-back rods. This shopfront area incorporates the entry and foyer of the former theatre, now the entrance to the antique centre as well as six shops, including a jewellers, cafe, second-hand shop and clothing shop. The shopfronts are generally large glass windows framed in silky oak, pairs of recessed entry doors and lower wall sections tiled in glossy black tiles. The awning is lined with fibro-cement sheeting with a geometric pattern of timber strips that are painted black against the cream sheeting.

A parapet runs above the awning with an arched feature located above the theatre entry doors decorated with urns and displaying the words "Paddington Antique Centre". The former theatre entry has four pairs of unpainted, silky oak framed glass doors with decorative brass hardware. The foyer area has a floor of "chequerboard" grey and white concrete flagstones and an ornate plaster ceiling decorated with scrolls and deep, moulded cornices. Brass lettering, reading "Paddington Plaza 1929" has been recently inlaid in the floor in an area formerly occupied by the ticket office. An office has been inserted into the south-west corner of the foyer space and a large counter area is in line with this. The foyer is divided from the auditorium space by large glass display cases located between two columns.

The former auditorium is a large rectangular space with a vaulted plaster ceiling painted a vivid and intense blue, known as "Reckitt's Blue". The ceiling paint is patchy and deteriorating, although remnants of painted clouds are discernible. Five lattice ventilation panels are located on both the northern and southern sides of the ceiling and a number of surface-mounted vents are also located on the ceiling. Fluorescent lights are suspended on chains from the ceiling and hang throughout the space, just above the level of the various wall dividers of the antique stalls.

The proscenium is located at the eastern end of the auditorium and has a sunken backstage area behind. The proscenium is ornately decorated, styled to give the appearance that it is part of the exterior of a building and is constructed of fibrous plaster. It has faceted columns to either side and is topped with a Spanish-style terracotta tiled roof supported on carved "corbels" with rosettes in between. The columns are painted in vibrant tones of orange, blue, red and yellow and decorated with moulded scrolls of foliage, flowers and urns. A multi-coloured cartouche is located in the centre of the proscenium arch and a velvet valance with gold fringing with the word "Plaza" in gold lettering in the centre hangs within the arch.

Angled, ornamental balconies are located either side of the proscenium. On the upper level these feature a balustrade, arches and "barley sugar" columns, at lower level there are arched niches alternating with more columns. All of these areas are decorated with moulded fibrous plaster decoration including egg and dart moulding and scrolls of leaves. These balcony areas have a colour scheme of pale green, white and a pale sandstone colour with touches of metallic bronze which is also incorporated into parts of the proscenium.

The rear wall of the auditorium has an upper section of timber lattice, also painted in "Reckitt's" blue and there is evidence of where the projection room was originally located, provided by the outline of the room painted in white. A recent exit and stair enclosed in fibro-cement sheeting is located on the north wall to the rear of the building, within the buttresses of the wall. The current timber floor is constructed above the original, raked floor and is supported on timber posts. The floor is at three levels. The rear of the auditorium is at the highest level, the largest middle section is three steps below this and then the backstage section is four steps below this. Toilets are located at a lower level in the backstage area and there is also a wings area on the southern side. A pair of twisted columns with moulded, fibrous plaster decoration is to be found in this area and the room is also painted in "Reckitt's" blue. A similar area that was located on the northern side of the proscenium and accommodated a public staircase has now been enclosed with fibro-cement sheeting. The staircase that formerly led to the downstairs toilets has now been blocked off and the stairway is incomplete. The original toilets are located at the eastern end of the undercroft area but are no longer used.

The roof is carried by curved, laminated timber (possibly Oregon) trusses. One of these has been supplemented with a steel truss due to extensive white ant and borer damage. The building is supported on large timber posts of varying heights reflecting the raked floor and the undercroft area has an earth floor. A galvanised iron duct system is located under the floor at the eastern end of the building. A small alleyway from Latrobe Terrace is to be found at the eastern end of the block and a small detached toilet block is located off this alleyway, connected to the building via a small area that has been enclosed with timber battens and fibro-cement sheeting.

== Heritage listing ==
Paddington Antiques Centre was listed on the Queensland Heritage Register on 28 March 2003 having satisfied the following criteria.

The place is important in demonstrating the evolution or pattern of Queensland's history.

The former Plaza Theatre at Paddington is important in illustrating the pattern of development of suburban cinemas in Brisbane, and in illustrating the evolution of cinemas in Queensland, during the interwar years of the 20th century. It is important also in illustrating the pattern of development of the Paddington district.

The place demonstrates rare, uncommon or endangered aspects of Queensland's cultural heritage.

It is a rare suburban "atmospheric" cinema, and understood to be one of few such theatres constructed in Queensland.

The place is important in demonstrating the principal characteristics of a particular class of cultural places.

The theatre and associated shops, the shopfronts in particular, remain substantially intact in form, design, materials and in much of the detailing, from which can be gained an understanding of the expectations brought by interwar film audiences to the experience of cinema viewing.

The place is important because of its aesthetic significance.

The former Plaza Theatre, located prominently on the high ridge of Latrobe Terrace, makes a major contribution to the local streetscape and to the Paddington townscape.

The place has a strong or special association with a particular community or cultural group for social, cultural or spiritual reasons.

The former Plaza Theatre has strong social significance in its association with the expansion of popular entertainment in the interwar period; in its association with the Paddington community; more recently in its association with the antiques industry in Brisbane; and as a landmark building in Brisbane's inner western suburbs.

The place has a special association with the life or work of a particular person, group or organisation of importance in Queensland's history.

The place is important for its association with independent film exhibition in Brisbane, and for its long association with the Hutchinson family, who are more usually recognised for their contribution to the building industry in Brisbane.
