= Boondah =

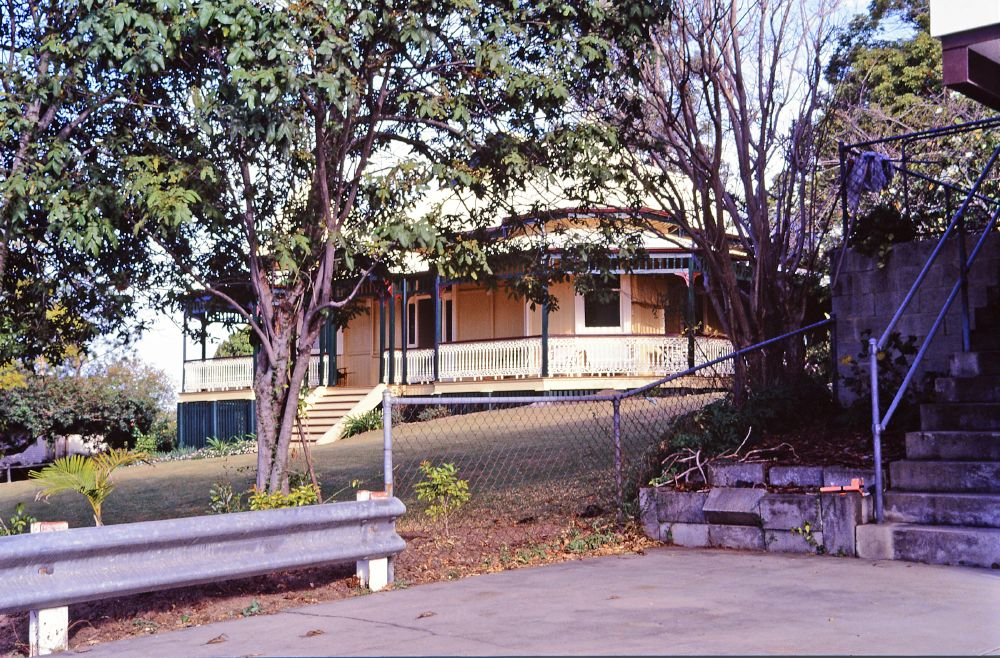
- Boondah, 1992

- Location within Queensland Location within Australia
- 27.468°S 152.9954°E
- Location: 50 Howard Street, Paddington, City of Brisbane, Queensland, Australia

History
- Design period: 1900–1914 (early 20th century)
- Built: c. 1907

Site notes
- Architect: Richard Gailey
- Architectural styles: Victorian Filigree, Queenslander

Queensland Heritage Register
- Official name: Boondah
- Type: state heritage (built, landscape)
- Designated: 11 June 1993
- Reference no.: 600288
- Significant period: 1900s (fabric, historical)
- Significant components: residential accommodation – main house, garden/grounds

Boondah is a heritage-listed detached house at 50 Howard Street, Paddington, City of Brisbane, Queensland, Australia. It was apparently designed by Richard Gailey and built c. 1907. It was added to the Queensland Heritage Register on 11 June 1993.

== History ==
This single-storeyed weatherboard house stands on land which was alienated in 1879 by George Blaxland Mott and subdivided after his death in 1882.

Ellen Wickham, widow of Captain John Clements Wickham, the governing official of Moreton Bay settlement until 1859, bought the site and lived there in a house called Manchonlas until her death in 1896. This dwelling was razed about 1906 and was replaced by Boondah c.1907, apparently to a design by notable architect Richard Gailey.

By 1907 Fenton Robinson was living at this address and the property remained with the Robinson family until 1967 and was acquired by the present owners in 1972.

== Description ==
Boondah is a single-storeyed weatherboard house with a corrugated iron gabled roof. The building sits on concrete stumps with timber batten infill and is sited on a ridge with the ground sloping to the northeast.

The symmetrical north elevation has two corner octagonal ogee shaped cupola's with tall timber finials and a central front entrance porch with a projecting gable roof. The building has verandahs with corrugated iron skillion roofs to the north, east and west which encircle the octagonal shaped corner bays.

The verandahs have cast iron balustrades with a timber valance and brackets. The verandah walls have single skin vertically jointed boards with French doors and sash windows. The front entrance has leadlight fanlight and sidelights, and opens to a central corridor leading to the rear of the building.

A rear verandah has been enclosed and the rear subfloor space has been bricked in. The grounds include an inground concrete swimming pool in the southeast and a large camphor laurel tree to the southwest. Entry to the site is from the north via a driveway cut into a steep earth embankment.

== Heritage listing ==
Boondah was listed on the Queensland Heritage Register on 11 June 1993 having satisfied the following criteria.

The place is important in demonstrating the evolution or pattern of Queensland's history.

Boondah is important in demonstrating the principal characteristics of a federation period timber house.

Boondah, both the house and grounds, is important in exhibiting aesthetic characteristics valued by the Brisbane community, in particular as a striking timber house composed with elaborate verandahs and roofline and for the streetscape contribution of the building and grounds.

The place is important in demonstrating the principal characteristics of a particular class of cultural places.

Boondah is important in demonstrating the principal characteristics of a federation period timber house.

The place is important because of its aesthetic significance.

Boondah, both the house and grounds, is important in exhibiting aesthetic characteristics valued by the Brisbane community, in particular as a striking timber house composed with elaborate verandahs and roofline and for the streetscape contribution of the building and grounds.
