= Yeronga Fire Station =

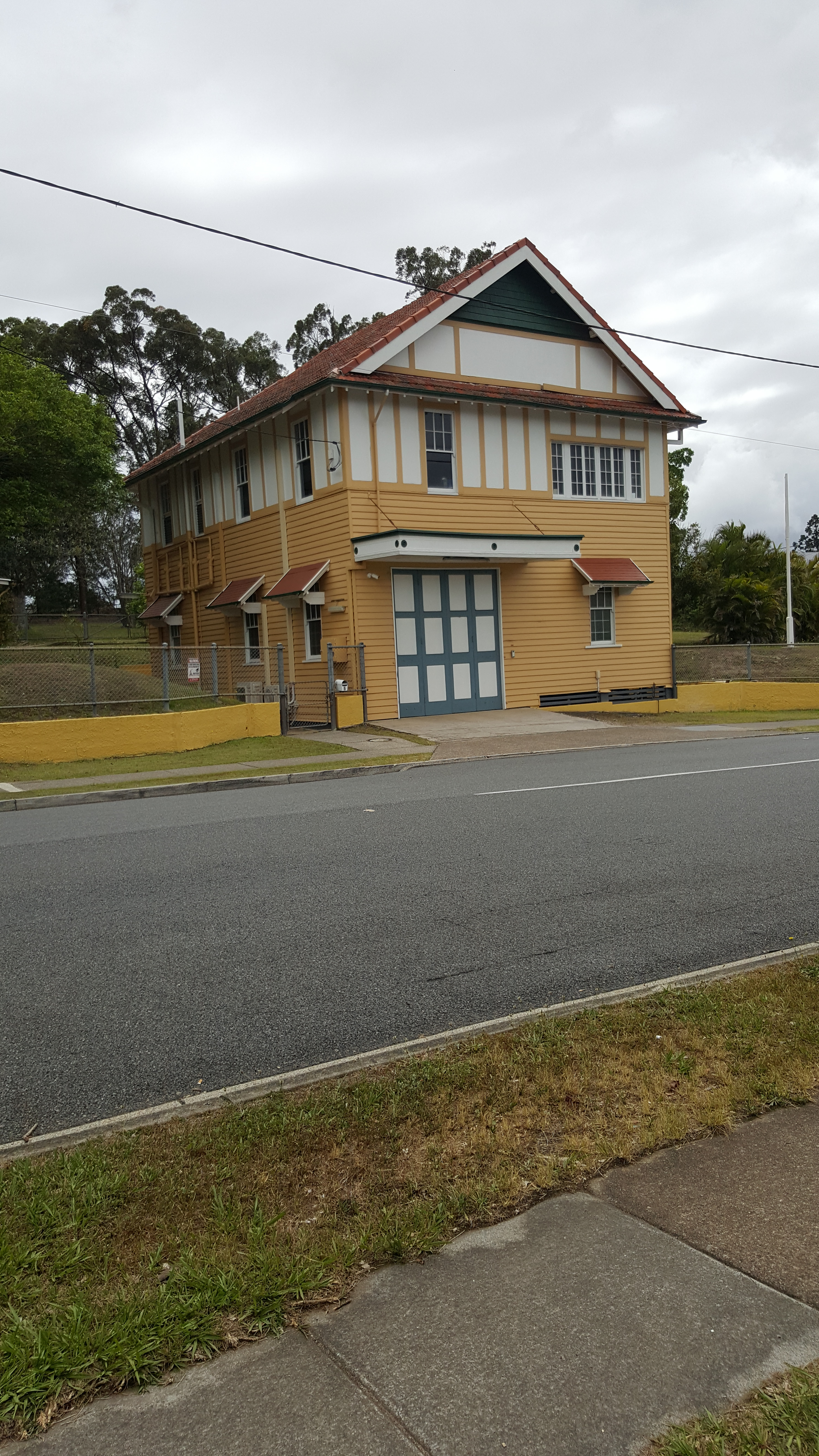
- Building as of November 2018

- Location within Queensland Location within Australia
- 27.5218°S 153.0254°E
- Location: 785 Ipswich Road, Yeronga, City of Brisbane, Queensland, Australia

History
- Design period: 1919–1930s (interwar period)
- Built: 1934

Site notes
- Architect: Atkinson and Conrad

Queensland Heritage Register
- Official name: Yeronga Fire Station (former), Queensland State Emergency Service Office
- Type: state heritage (built)
- Designated: 23 April 1999
- Reference no.: 602144
- Significant period: 1934 (fabric); 1934–1974 (historical)
- Significant components: driveway, residential accommodation – superintendent's house/quarters, shed/s, dormitory, watch room, recreation area/room/building/hall/centre, engine room / appliance bay (fire station)
- Builders: William Allen Miller

Yeronga Fire Station is a heritage-listed former fire station at 785 Ipswich Road, Yeronga, City of Brisbane, Queensland, Australia. It was designed by architectural firm Atkinson and Conrad, and built in 1934 by contractor William Allen Miller. It is a two-storey timber structure adjacent to Yeronga Park, and originally housed the station facilities on the ground floor and a residence for the superintendent on the first floor, a combination typical for Brisbane fire stations of this era.

The station was decommissioned in 1974, when operations were shifted to the new station at Acacia Ridge. It was subsequently used as offices for the Queensland State Emergency Service, but was put up for sale by the Department of Natural Resources in 1999; as of 2014, the building was being used as offices for a consulting firm. It was added to the Queensland Heritage Register on 23 April 1999.

== History ==
Between 1860 and 1868, there were five attempts to form a firefighting service for Brisbane. Each brigade struggled to survive, unable to attract a viable subscription base, hampered by inadequate equipment and an unreliable water supply, and given a low priority among civic and government leaders. A fifth brigade, the City Volunteer Fire Brigade, was established in 1868 under rules which provided for better financial control and management through the Fire Brigade Board. These arrangements were consolidated by the Fire Brigades Act of 1881, which established that the Brigade was to be funded from contributions by the Queensland Government, Brisbane Municipal Council, insurance companies, and subscriptions. In 1889, the first full-time firemen were hired, and a permanent fire brigade was established. A new headquarters, designed by Henry Wallace Atkinson, was completed on the corner of Ann and Edwards Streets (on a corner of the Normal School site) in 1890.

After the establishment of the South Coast railway in 1884, the Metropolitan Fire Brigades Board was attempting to respond to the increased firefighting needs of the expanding Brisbane suburbs. In the 1930s, the Board was resiting old stations and erecting new stations under a program funded by the Queensland Government, instigated by the Minister for Health and Home Affairs, Ned Hanlon. The Yeronga Fire Station, the first fire station in Yeronga, was erected under this program by contractor William Allen Miller, and opened by William Brian Denmead, chairman of the Metropolitan Fire Brigades Board, on 18 April 1934. The building housed the station facilities on the ground floor and a residence for the superintendent on the first floor. This combination of station and residence was the typical design for fire stations in Brisbane at this time. Similar, though larger, residential fire stations were built at Coorparoo in 1935 (Coorparoo Fire Station); Nundah in 1936 (Nundah Fire Station); Wynnum in 1938 (Wynnum Fire Station); and Hamilton in 1941.

During World War II, Yeronga Park was used by the United States Army as a military camp, and an effigy of Adolf Hitler was hung from the awning at the fire station. The Yeronga Fire Station was decommissioned in 1974 when operations were relocated to the new Acacia Ridge Station. It was subsequently used as an office for the Queensland State Emergency Service, but was put up for sale by the Department of Natural Resources in 1999. As of 2014, the building was being used as offices for a consulting firm.

== Description ==
Yeronga Fire Station is a two-storey timber-framed structure, clad with weatherboards to the lower level and battened fibro sheeting to the upper level, beneath a red terracotta tiled gabled roof. An awning with a pressed metal edging decorated with pateras and fluting shelters the engine room entrance to the School Road frontage and is supported by steel tie-rods fixed to the exterior of the first floor.

Rectangular in plan, the ground floor contains an engine room, watchroom, dormitory, kitchen, bathroom and recreation room. Tall, vertical, timber, bifold, counterweighted doors to School Road open into the engine room around which the other rooms are arranged in an L-shape. The concrete floor to the engine room has been painted green but the red fire engine guide tracks are evident in areas where the paint has worn. The watchroom is at the front of the station off the engine room and opens into the adjacent dormitory. The fireman's pole terminated in a small hall in the centre of the building to the rear of the engine room. The pole has been removed. The kitchen, bathroom and dormitory open off this hall. The recreation room is to the rear of the station off the engine room and opening to the rear yard. All ground floor rooms are lined with tongue-and-groove boarding and have fibro sheeted battened ceilings. The dormitory contains built-in timber cupboards and tilting fanlights to the engine room wall. The bathroom has a terrazzo floor. A serving hatch has been cut into the wall between the kitchen and the recreation room.

A dog-leg timber stair at the rear of the station connects to the entrance to the residential accommodation for the station superintendent above which contains three bedrooms, living room, kitchen, bathroom and hall. A laundry, on a suspended concrete slab supported by concrete piers, is off the landing of the dog-leg stair. The entrance to the residence opens off a small sheltered porch at the top of the stair through an arched doorway into a central hall. The smaller bedrooms and bathroom are through an arched opening to the west of the hall and the kitchen and living room open to the east and south of the hall. The cupboard to the east of the hall that housed the fireman's pole is now used for storage. The kitchen no longer functions as a kitchen but cupboards to the west and an arched recess and broom cupboard to the south remain. The bedroom to the northwest and the bathroom have been converted to toilets. The living room has an arched recess and opens to an enclosed verandah to the southeast. The wall separating bedrooms one and two has been removed. All rooms are lined with tongue-and-groove boarding and have fibro sheeted and battened ceilings. The battening to the ceiling in bedroom one forms a lozenge-like pattern.

A small, tubular-steel and chain wire gate to the west of the station opens to a drained, concrete path continuous about the west, north and east of the station. A battered bank rises up on each side of the concrete path to the level of the park behind. Concrete vehicle tracks from Ipswich Road gateway finish at the rear of the station. Repairs to the northeast corner of the concrete path indicate the location of an earlier tank stand. Two timber sheds have been erected to the rear of the station for storage and additional office accommodation.

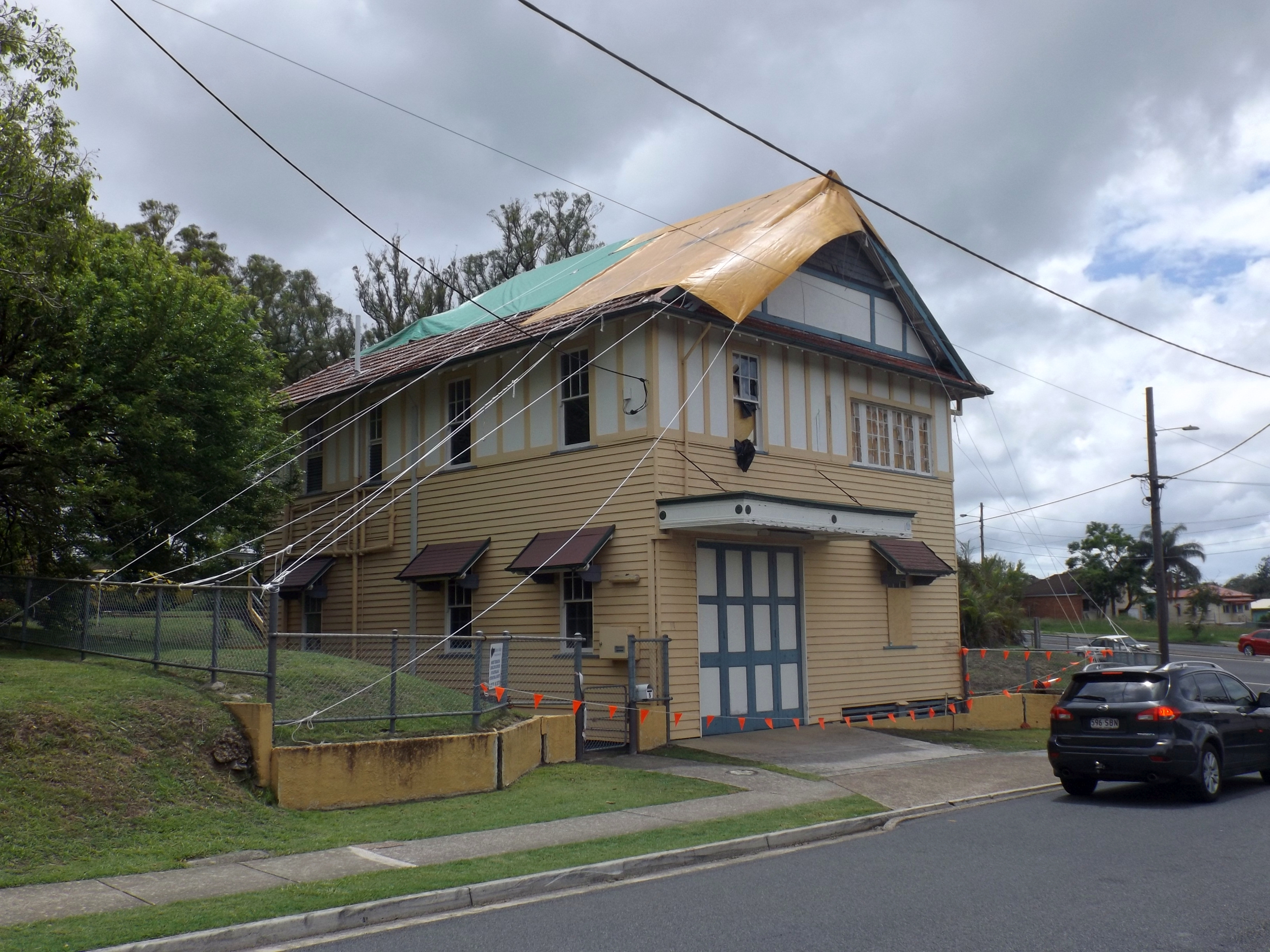
Tarpaulins protecting the roof following damage during the 2014 Brisbane hailstorm

On 27 November 2014, it was damaged by hail and rain in the 2014 Brisbane hailstorm.

== Heritage listing ==
The former Yeronga Fire Station was listed on the Queensland Heritage Register on 23 April 1999 having satisfied the following criteria.

The place is important in demonstrating the evolution or pattern of Queensland's history.

The former Yeronga Fire Station is an important example of the upgrading of fire stations undertaken in Brisbane suburbs by the Queensland Government through the Metropolitan Fire Board during the 1930s.

The former Yeronga Fire Station is important in demonstrating the growth of Yeronga during the 1930s.

The place is important in demonstrating the principal characteristics of a particular class of cultural places.

The former Yeronga Fire Station is an important example of the architecture and planning of Brisbane suburban fire stations of the 1930s. The interiors in both the operational and domestic areas are substantially intact.

The place is important because of its aesthetic significance.

The former Yeronga Fire Station has aesthetic and architectural significance as a modest, functional civic building. Robust and austere, it is a landmark on Ipswich Road, a busy Brisbane arterial.

The place has a strong or special association with a particular community or cultural group for social, cultural or spiritual reasons.

The former Yeronga Fire Station is important as one of a number of civic and community service buildings located within Yeronga Park.

The place has a special association with the life or work of a particular person, group or organisation of importance in Queensland's history.

The former Yeronga Fire Station is an important example of the work of the architectural firm Atkinson and Conrad. Atkinson, through the firms he was associated with, sustained a long association with the Fire Services in Brisbane commencing in 1890 with his design for the new headquarters for the Brisbane Fire Brigade. His architectural practices were responsible for many of the fire stations throughout Brisbane.
