= Nundah Fire Station =

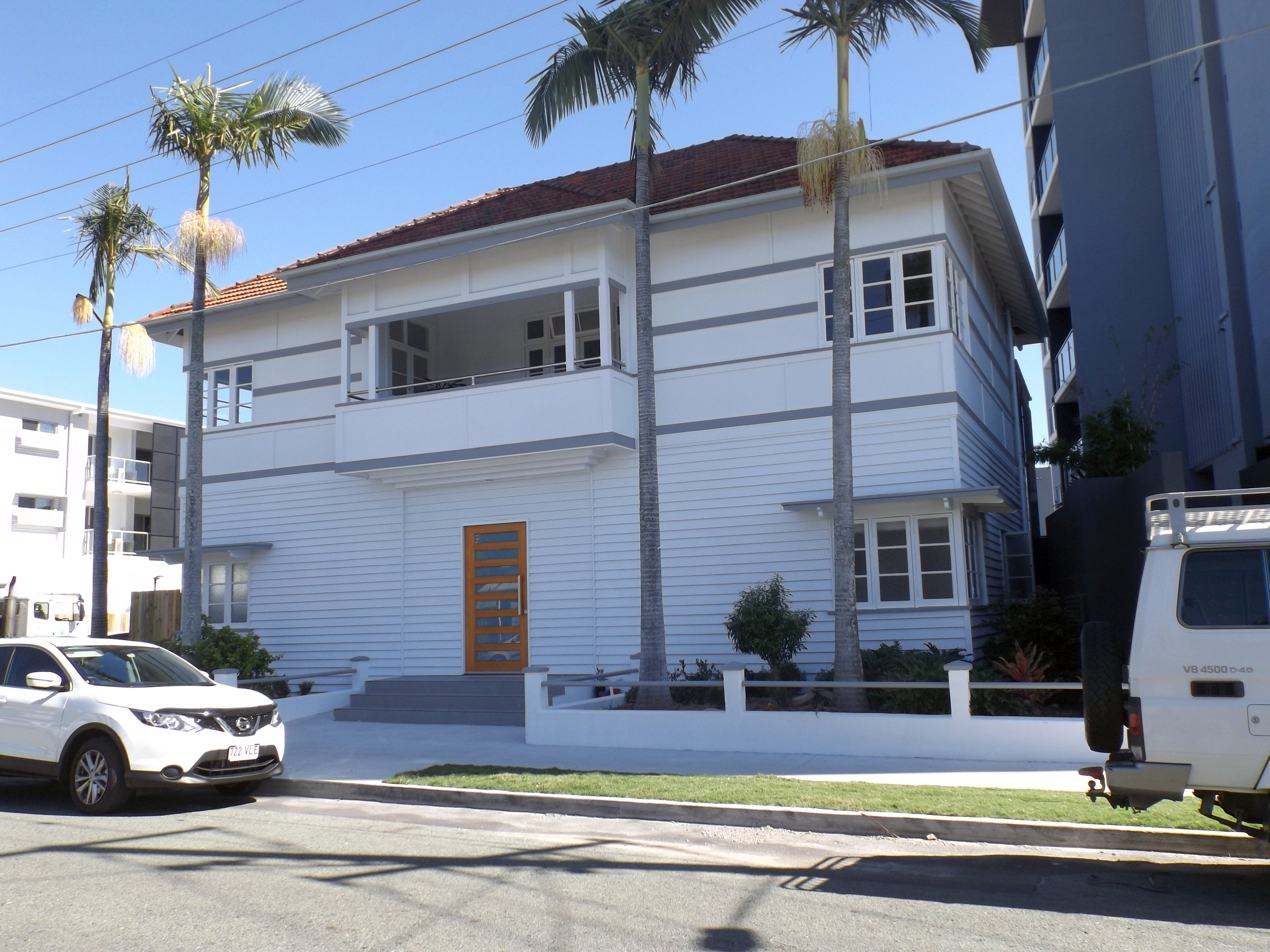
- Building in 2015

- Location within Queensland Location within Australia
- 27.4041°S 153.0618°E
- Location: 7 Union Street, Nundah, City of Brisbane, Queensland, Australia

History
- Design period: 1919–1930s (interwar period)
- Built: 1936

Site notes
- Architect: Atkinson & Conrad

Queensland Heritage Register
- Official name: Nundah Fire Station (former)
- Type: state heritage (built)
- Designated: 26 March 1999
- Reference no.: 602119
- Significant period: 1936 (fabric); 1936–1999 (historical)
- Significant components: engine room / appliance bay (fire station), watch room, residential accommodation – superintendent's house/quarters, driveway, dormitory, shed/s, pathway/walkway
- Builders: T F Woollam

Nundah Fire Station is a heritage-listed former fire station at 7 Union Street, Nundah, City of Brisbane, Queensland, Australia. It was designed by Atkinson & Conrad and built in 1936 by T F Woollam. It was added to the Queensland Heritage Register on 26 March 1999.

== History ==
A modest, functional civic building, the Nundah Fire Station has been the operational centre for fire services in Nundah since 1936. Between 1860 and 1868 there were five attempts to form a fire fighting service for Brisbane. Each brigade struggled to survive unable to attract a viable subscription base and hampered by inadequate equipment and an unreliable water supply. The establishment of an effective fire service did not enjoy a high priority among civic and government leaders.

A fifth brigade, the City Volunteer Fire Brigade, was established in 1868. New rules provided for better financial control and balanced representation through the Fire Brigade Board with membership from the Brisbane Municipal Council and insurance companies. These arrangements were consolidated by the Fire Brigades Act 1881. Funding for fire services came from contributions by the Queensland Government, Brisbane Municipal Council, insurance companies and subscriptions. In 1889 the first full-time firemen were employed and a permanent fire brigade was established. A new headquarters, designed by Henry Wallace Atkinson, was completed on the corner of Ann and Edwards Streets (on a corner of the Normal School site) in 1890. This began a long association between the Fire Brigade and the various architectural firms with whom he was associated.

The fire fighting needs of the city increased as Brisbane continued to develop. Nundah Fire Brigade was formed by volunteer local residents in 1916 after the Fire Brigades Act Amendment Act 1902 allowed local authorities to establish independent boards and brigades. Brigades were formed in Hamilton (1917), Windsor 1917, Ithaca 1918, Toowong 1918, Taringa 1919, Wynnum 1921 and Sandgate 1923. These were voluntary bodies with only the superintendent and immediate assistants receiving a salary. The Fire Brigades Act of 1920 rationalised the network of fire brigades in Brisbane and suburbs, centralising control under the Metropolitan Fire Brigades Board in 1921.

The Nundah Fire Brigade stored its equipment at the Royal Hotel until a shed and bell tower were erected in Union Street, Nundah in 1917. This shed functioned as the Nundah Fire Station until 1936 when the Metropolitan Fire Brigade Board was resiting old fire stations and erecting new stations, funded by the Queensland Government, as part of an upgrading of fire services under the Minister for Health and Home Affairs, Ned Hanlon. Under this program, the early fire station at Nundah was demolished and a new purpose-built two storey station was constructed to a design by HW Atkinson and AH Conrad by the contractor TF Woollam. The station was opened by Hanlon on 11 December 1936. Other stations built under this policy include Coorparoo Fire Station, Wynnum Fire Station, Hamilton, Sherwood, Sandgate and Toowong.

The new building housed the station facilities on the ground floor and a residence for the superintendent on the first floor. This combination of station and residence was common in fire stations and this plan was duplicated at Wynnum and Coorparoo.

In 1990 the Metropolitan Fire Brigade became a division of the Bureau of Emergency Services. The Nundah Fire Station was decommissioned in 1999 and operations transferred to a new station at Hendra.

The former fire station was converted into two residential apartments, one on the ground floor and one on the upper floor.

== Description ==
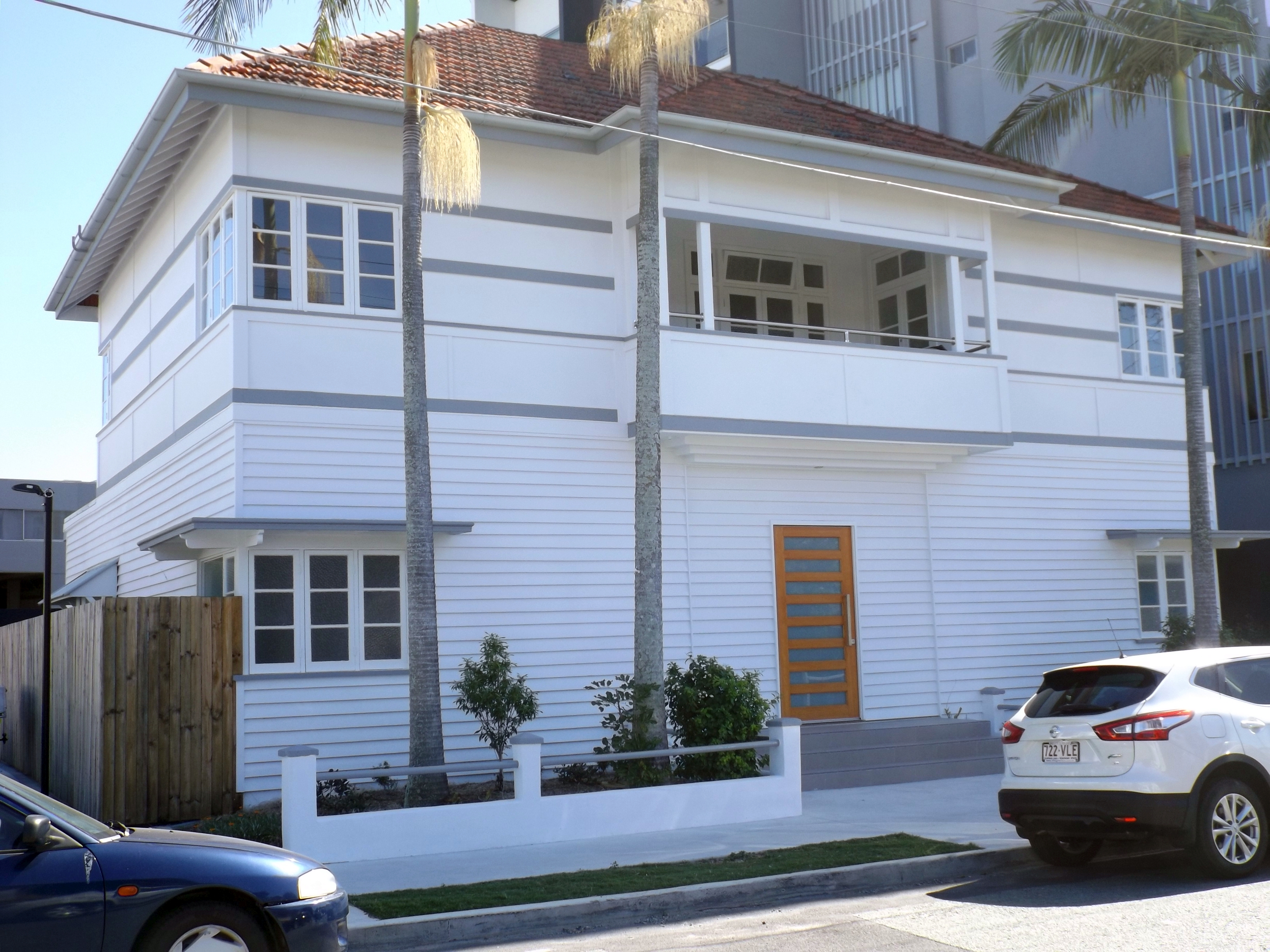
Structure in 2015

The Nundah Fire Station is a two-storey, symmetrical timber-framed building at the north end of Union Street off Buckland Road and backing onto the railway line. The building is clad with fibrous cement sheeting to the first storey, has timber weatherboards to the lower storey and a terracotta tiled hip roof. On the first floor a central, open verandah balcony projects over the engine room entrance with "Nundah Fire Station" painted in red across the sheeting to the lower part of the balcony. The black painted horizontal cover battens against the white painted sheeting to the first storey give the building a striking street presence.

The ground floor of the Fire Station accommodates the engine room, watch office, locker room and ablutions area, dormitory, kitchen, laundry and duty officer bedroom. The timber pole connecting the residence to the engine room has been sawn off at the first floor level and the pole cupboard is now used for storage at ground level. The locker room contains intact purpose built lockers for the firemen's uniforms and personal effects. The concrete floor to the engine room is marked with red wheel tracks and a concrete footpath crossing connects to the street. The interiors are lined with tongue and groove boarding and the ceilings are sheeted and battened, except the watchroom which is plastered. A brass plaque commemorating the opening of the station is on the engine room wall outside the watch office. The rear external timber stairs have been replaced with metal stairs and the laundry now accommodates an additional shower. Windows to the ground level are shaded by horizontal timber hoods on cantilevered timber brackets and fixed aluminium louvre screens have been added around the windows.

The residence on the first floor has a kitchen, living room, dining room, an open verandah balcony, three bedrooms and a bathroom. The living and dining rooms and main bedroom open by French doors onto the verandah balcony. There are glazed fanlights above these French doors and side lights to those off the dining room. The pole connecting the residence and the station below is housed in a cupboard adjacent to the bathroom. The interiors are clad with tongue and groove boarding and the ceilings sheeted and battened. The kitchen cupboards, linen cupboard, dining room cupboard and main bedroom wardrobe remain. The terrazzo floor to the bathroom survives.

The grassed and concreted grounds are well maintained. A concrete path leads from a chain and rail gate in the north east corner to the rear stairs to the residence. A concrete driveway to the south east arrives at the hose drying area and shed to the rear of the station. Recently planted palms (Archontophoenix sp.) are to the north and south boundaries and to front of the station.

== Heritage listing ==
Nundah Fire Station (former) was listed on the Queensland Heritage Register on 26 March 1999 having satisfied the following criteria.

The place is important in demonstrating the evolution or pattern of Queensland's history.

Nundah Fire Station is an important example of the upgrading of fire stations undertaken in Brisbane suburbs by the Queensland Government through the Metropolitan Fire Board during the 1930s. The building has been in continual use as a fire station from 1936 to 1999.

The place is important in demonstrating the principal characteristics of a particular class of cultural places.

Nundah Fire Station is an intact example of the work of the architectural firm Atkinson and Conrad. Nundah Fire Station is a fine intact example of the architecture and planning of Brisbane suburban fire stations of the 1930s incorporating offices and engine room to the ground floor and a residence to the first floor. The interiors in both the operational and domestic areas are intact interiors and reflect the operation of 1930s fire stations. The kitchen is a fine example of an intact domestic interior.

The place is important because of its aesthetic significance.

Nundah Fire Station, with its associated grounds, has aesthetic and architectural significance as a modest, functional civic building. Robust and austere, with its simple but striking horizontal banding and use of readily available materials, it is easily identified in the streetscape.

The place has a strong or special association with a particular community or cultural group for social, cultural or spiritual reasons.

Nundah Fire Station is important for the continuing association of the Fire Brigade with the community of Nundah since the establishment of fire fighting services for the area by local resident volunteers in 1916.

The place has a special association with the life or work of a particular person, group or organisation of importance in Queensland's history.

Atkinson, through the firms he was associated with, sustained a long association with the Fire Services in Brisbane commencing in 1890 with his design for the new headquarters for the Brisbane Fire Brigade. His architectural practices were responsible for many of the fire stations throughout Brisbane.
