= Wynnum Fire Station =

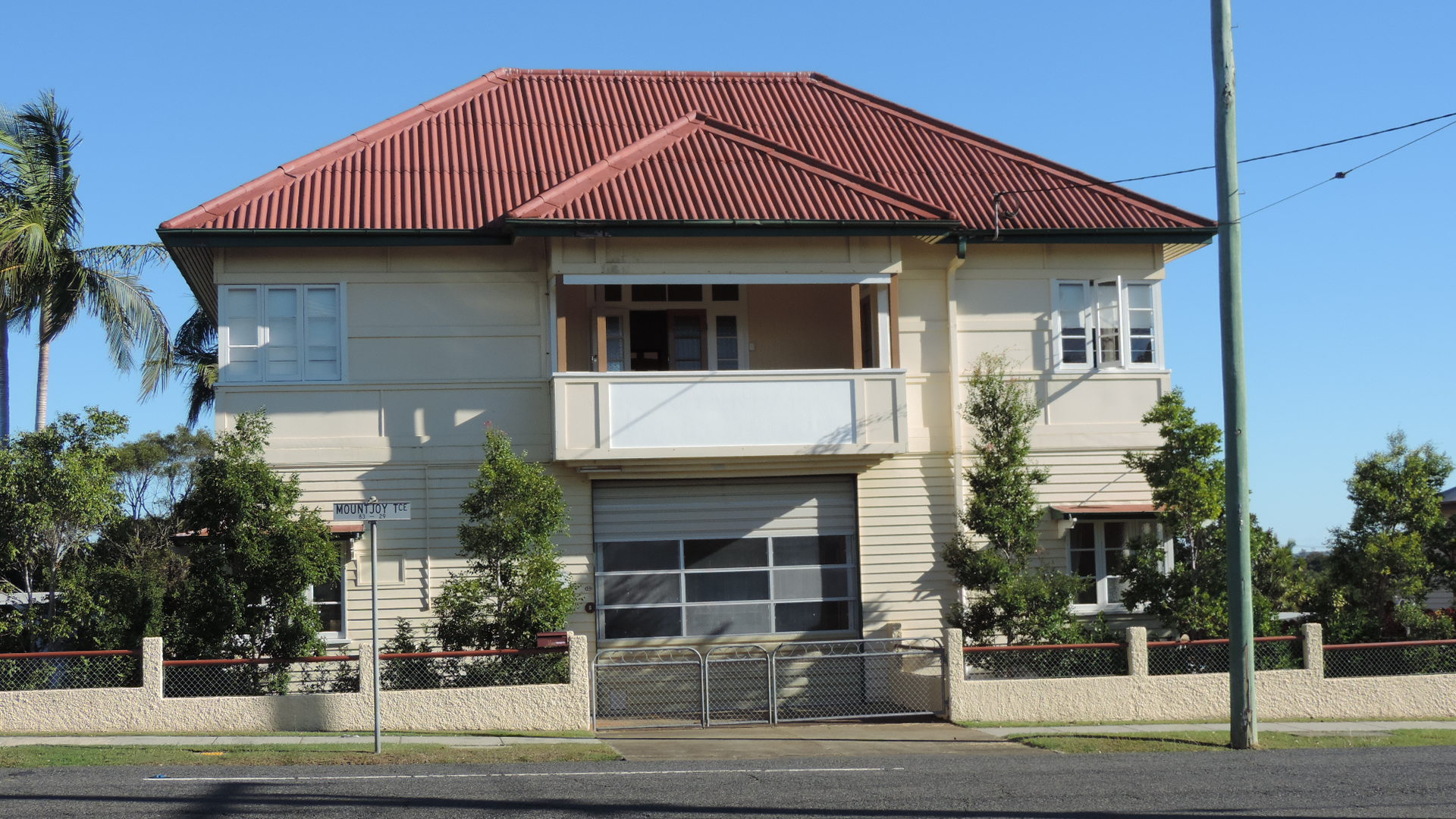
- Former Wynnum Fire Station, 2014

- Location within Queensland Location within Australia
- 27.4513°S 153.1773°E
- Location: 39 Mountjoy Terrace, Wynnum, City of Brisbane, Queensland, Australia

History
- Design period: 1919–1930s (interwar period)
- Built: 1922–1938

Site notes
- Architect: Atkinson & Conrad

Queensland Heritage Register
- Official name: Wynnum Fire Station (former), Wynnum Fire Station
- Type: state heritage (built)
- Designated: 28 May 1999
- Reference no.: 602143
- Significant period: 1938 (fabric); 1938–c. 2003 (historical)
- Significant components: watch room, engine room / appliance bay (fire station), dormitory, residential accommodation – superintendent's house/quarters, driveway

Wynnum Fire Station is a heritage-listed former fire station at 39 Mountjoy Terrace, Wynnum, City of Brisbane, Queensland, Australia. It was designed by Atkinson & Conrad and built from 1922 to 1938. It was added to the Queensland Heritage Register on 28 May 1999.

== History ==
A modest, functional civic building, the former Wynnum Fire Station is a prominent landmark on Mountjoy Terrace in Wynnum.

Between 1860 and 1868 there were five attempts to form a fire fighting service for Brisbane. Each brigade struggled to survive, unable to attract a viable subscription base and hampered by inadequate equipment and an unreliable water supply. The establishment of an effective fire service did not enjoy a high priority among civic and government leaders.

A fifth brigade, the City Volunteer Fire Brigade, was established in 1868 under rules which provided for better financial control and management through the Fire Brigade Board. These arrangements were consolidated by the Fire Brigades Act 1881 under which it was established that the Brigade was to be funded for fire services from contributions by the Queensland State Government, Brisbane Municipal Council, insurance companies and subscriptions. In 1889 the first full-time firemen were employed and a permanent fire brigade was established. A new headquarters, designed by Henry Wallace Atkinson, was completed on the corner of Ann and Edward streets (on a corner of the Normal School site) in 1890. This began a long association between the Fire Brigade and the various architectural firms with whom he was associated.

Fire Services in Wynnum In the south-east of Brisbane, Wynnum sits on Moreton Bay. The railway link to Cleveland via Wynnum in 1888 was a major impetus to closer settlement with large areas of land being taken up soon after. The district expanded rapidly over the next twenty years until in 1913 the Town Council of Wynnum was constituted. The area became known as a seaside resort and the Wynnum and Manly foreshore area became increasingly popular with day visitors and holiday-makers. Since that time it has developed as a dormitory suburb of Brisbane, conveniently linked to the city.

Wynnum was perceived to be a "healthy" place to live with its sea breezes, protected beaches, vistas to Moreton Bay, fishing and the availability of fresh local produce. The district continued to expand as the number of permanent residents increased; services and infrastructure were introduced; building activity expanded; and civic and community associations were established.

The first fire brigade was established in Wynnum in 1921. Three blocks of land were purchased in Mountjoy Terrace, opposite Wolsey Parade, and a temporary building erected to serve as the fire station and residence. The Wynnum District was included in the Metropolitan Fire Brigade Board's District in 1928 and the brigade continued to operate from this station until the Metropolitan Fire Brigade Board replaced it with a new station under a fire services upgrading program funded by the Queensland Government and instigated by the Minister for Health and Home Affairs, Edward (Ned) Hanlon. The Wynnum Fire Station was opened by Hanlon on 25 May 1938. The new building housed the station facilities on the ground floor and a residence for the superintendent on the first floor. This combination of station and residence was the typical design for fire stations in Brisbane at this time. Similar residential fire stations included Yeronga Fire Station (1934), Coorparoo Fire Station (1935), Nundah Fire Station (1936) and Hamilton Fire Station (1941). A weatherboard-clad, gabled shed was constructed at some time shortly after the new fire station, being visible in a 1943 aerial photograph.

The 1938 building continued to operate as a fire station until 2004 when a new facility for the service was built elsewhere and this property was sold into private ownership. Since that time it has served as a residence.

== Description ==
The former Wynnum Fire Station is a two-storey, symmetrical timber-framed building in Mountjoy Terrace opposite the south-western end of Wolsey Parade. The building is clad with fibrous cement sheeting to the first storey, has timber weatherboards to the lower storey and a corrugated, fibro-cement sheeted hip roof. On the first floor a central, open verandah balcony projects over the engine room entrance with "Wynnum Fire Station" painted in red across the sheeting to the lower part of the balcony.

The ground floor of the former fire station accommodates the engine room, watch office, locker room and ablutions area, dormitory, kitchen, laundry and duty officer bedroom. The timber pole connecting the residence to the engine room has been removed and the pole cupboard is now used for storage at ground level. The locker room contains intact purpose-built lockers for the firemen's uniforms and personal effects. The concrete floor to the engine room is marked with red wheel tracks and a concrete footpath crossing connects to the street. The interiors are lined with tongue and groove boarding and the ceilings are sheeted and battened. The laundry now accommodates additional lockers and storage. Windows to the ground level are shaded by horizontal timber hoods on decorative, cantilevered timber brackets.

An extension has been inserted between the laundry and the duty officer's bedroom to accommodate a shower to the bedroom and provide additional storage area. A shower has also been added to the ablutions area of the locker room.

The rear external timber stairs connect to the former residence above. The residence has a kitchen, living room, dining room, an open verandah balcony, three bedrooms and a bathroom. The living room, dining room and main bedroom open by French doors onto the verandah balcony. There are glazed fanlights above these French doors and side lights to those off the dining room. The pole cupboard housing the pole that connected the residence and the station below is adjacent to the bathroom. The interiors are clad with tongue and groove boarding and the ceilings sheeted and battened. Original fabric remains including kitchen cupboards, linen cupboard, dining room cupboard and main bedroom wardrobe. The bathroom is substantially intact with the terrazzo floor, pressed metal wall sheeting and the original hot water heater remaining. A carved keystone timber archway separates the dining room from the bathroom/bedroom area.

There is a gable-roofed timber shed in the south-west corner of the site. Clad in weatherboards and flat sheets at the gable ends, internally the shed is partitioned into two spaces.

The grassed and concreted grounds are well maintained. A concrete driveway along the western boundary arrives at the hose drying area and shed to the side and rear of the station. Recently planted palms (Archontophoenix) stand to the front of the station.

== Heritage listing ==
The former Wynnum Fire Station was listed on the Queensland Heritage Register on 28 May 1999 having satisfied the following criteria.

The place is important in demonstrating the evolution or pattern of Queensland's history.

The former Wynnum Fire Station is an important example of the upgrading of fire stations undertaken in Brisbane suburbs by the Queensland Government through the Metropolitan Fire Board during the 1930s.

The former Wynnum Fire Station is important in demonstrating the growth of Wynnum during the early twentieth century and into the 1930s.

The place demonstrates rare, uncommon or endangered aspects of Queensland's cultural heritage.

The former Wynnum Fire Station is a rare and intact example of the architecture and planning of Brisbane suburban fire stations of the 1930s. The station remains as the only operational fire station from the 1930s. The interiors in both the operational and domestic areas are substantially intact. The place is rare in demonstrating the development of the fire service in Wynnum with both fire station buildings remaining on the one site.

The place is important in demonstrating the principal characteristics of a particular class of cultural places.

The former Wynnum Fire Station is a rare and intact example of the architecture and planning of Brisbane suburban fire stations of the 1930s. The Station remains as the only operational fire station from the 1930s. The interiors in both the operational and domestic areas are substantially intact.

The place is important because of its aesthetic significance.

The former Wynnum Fire Station has aesthetic and architectural significance as a modest, functional civic building. Robust and austere, it is a landmark on Mountjoy Terrace within Wynnum.

The place has a special association with the life or work of a particular person, group or organisation of importance in Queensland's history.

The former Wynnum Fire Station is important for its association with the work of the architectural firm Atkinson and Conrad. Atkinson, through the firms he was associated with, sustained a long association with the Fire Services in Brisbane commencing in 1890 with his design for the new headquarters for the Brisbane Fire Brigade. His architectural practices were responsible for many of the fire stations throughout Brisbane.
