= Brisbane Municipal Concert Band =

Australian musical group

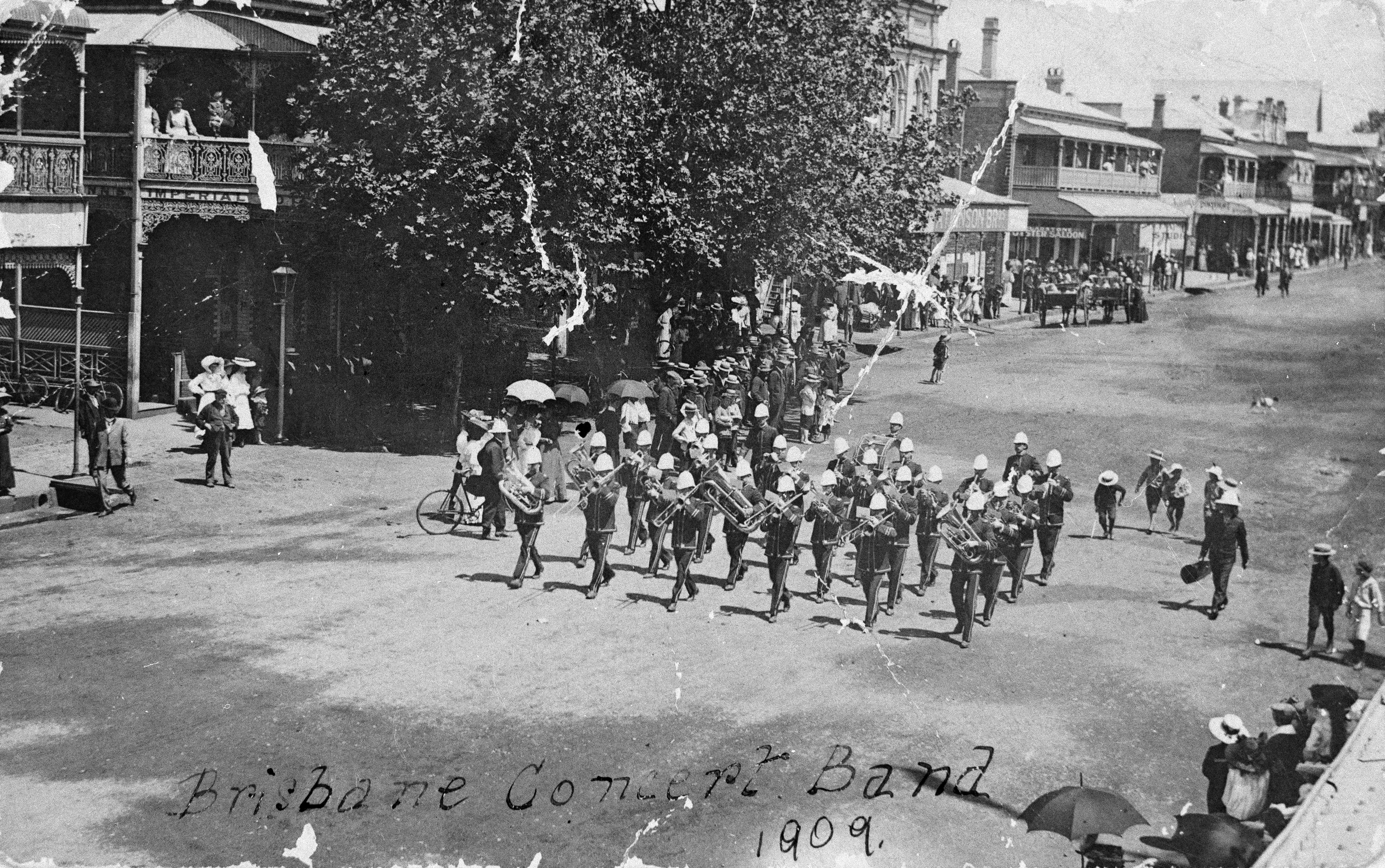
Brisbane Municipal Concert Band marching, 1909

The Brisbane Municipal Concert Band is a community band of amateur musicians in Brisbane, Queensland, Australia. It is also known as the Brisbane Concert Band. It was founded in 1903 and continues to operate to the present time (2014), making it Brisbane's oldest concert band.

== History ==
In 1903, Joseph Hendry Grice founded Valley Concert Band; it met in a Fortitude Valley drapery store.

In 1921, the band won the Australasian Champion Band (military grade) contest held in Ballarat. In 1925 the Brisbane City Council provided funds for the band to return to Ballarat to defend its title.

On 11 April 1927 the band performed at the garden party at New Farm Park for the Duke and Duchess of York when they visited Brisbane.

In 1928, the band performed at the Anzac Day ceremony at the Windsor War Memorial Park.

In 1932 the band played at the Anzac Day Service at Graceville Memorial Park in Brisbane. The band has maintained a tradition of playing for Anzac Day services, RSL clubs and Service Personnel. During both World Wars the BMCB band played at services welcoming home the troops at South Brisbane railway station.

The BMCB celebrated its centenary in 2003 with a concert at the Old Museum, Bowen Hills, Brisbane.

It is locally known for its "Sunday Concerts-In-The-Park" programme, annual Gala Concerts and appearances in the Brisbane City Hall.

On 25 October 2008, the BMCB accompanied the French Les Philharmonistes des Pays de Vauclose, in St John's Cathedral, Ann Street, Brisbane. A few years later in 2011 at Roma Street Parkland the BMCB joined the Brisbane Symphonic Band conducted by Stefanie Smith for a musical concert Witches, Wizards And Warlocks. A total of 100 musicians performed music about witches, wizards and warlocks for children's entertainment.

== Conductors ==
The first conductor was band founder Joseph Hendry Grice.

In 1908 Ebenezer Jackson took over the BMCB to be the longest-serving conductor. Also known as "Ebby", he continued until just before his death in 1953.

Since then the BMCB has had a number of conductors, including H. Bukler (1953–71, 1976–80), E.T Selby (1973–75), S. Fawcett (1980–82, 1983), B.Warden (1982), T. O'Shea (1984), E. Karuas (1985), T. Shacklady (1985–88), M. Roth (1989), K. Stitt (1989–92), P. Burns (1991), J. Black (1992) and David Jones (1992–current),

== Current activities ==
The BMCB is a regular on the Sunday Concerts-In-The-Park' programme. Rehearsals are currently held at Paddington Hall, 10 Moreton Street, Paddington.

== See also ==
- Music of Brisbane
