= Murder of Andrew Dingwall =

1954 murder in Mount Morgan, Queensland

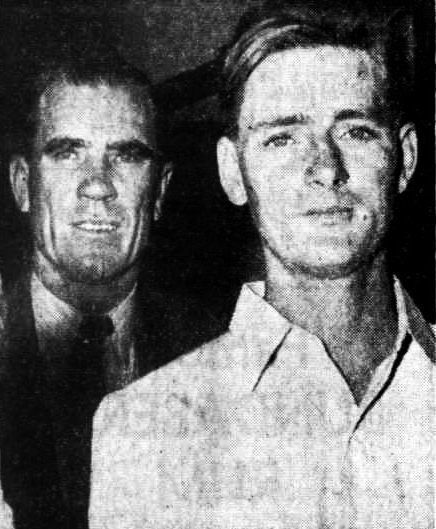
- Patrick Joseph Platts (right) accompanied by Detective Senior Sergeant Harry Gilbert Cook entering Mount Morgan Court of Petty Sessions on 1 April 1954
- Date: 22 March 1954
- Time: c. 3:00 am
- Location: Mount Morgan, Queensland
- Cause: stabbing
- Deaths: Andrew Dingwall
- Burial: Toowong, Queensland
- Suspects: Patrick Joseph Platts
- Charges: wilful murder
- Verdict: guilty

On 22 March 1954, Andrew Dingwall, a 50-year-old newsagent was murdered by 19-year-old Patrick Joseph Platts who violently stabbed Dingwall 17 times and slashed his throat during a bungled robbery of Dingwall's newsagency in Mount Morgan, Queensland.

Dingwall had attempted to confront Platts after he caught him trespassing on his premises before Platts used a sheath knife to fatally stab Dingwall in a frenzied attack before escaping in a taxi to Rockhampton and throwing the weapon into the river from the Fitzroy Bridge.

On 19 May 1954, Platts was convicted by a jury of wilful murder and sentenced to life imprisonment with hard labour at Stuart Creek Gaol near Townsville.

On 11 June 1955, Platts escaped from the gaol with fellow inmate Stanley Gordon Taylor, prompting a widespread search. They were both eventually recaptured, but their escape prompted an inquiry into the administration of Stuart Creek Gaol.

== Murder of Dingwall ==
Dingwall was found dead with a slashed throat and 17 stab wounds by a customer at around 6:30am on 22 March 1954 at the rear of his newsagency in Morgan Street where he usually slept on a mattress. The time of death was estimated to have occurred at around 3:00am.

Dingwall was born in Brisbane on 7 October 1903 to Andrew and Mollie Frances Dingwall. He served with the Citizen Military Force during World War II, having enlisted in Kununoppin in Western Australia. He had moved to Mount Morgan six years prior to his murder having formerly been a manager of a newsagency in Toowoomba where he lived for about 12 months.

After his death, he was buried in a cemetery in Toowong during a small graveside service. It was reported that only six mourners attended, including his elderly mother, despite his funeral notice being published in newspapers.

Dingwall's sister Helen Carberry said that he had been planning to retire and had been attempting to sell the Mount Morgan newsagency for about a year. She lamented that if Dingwall had accepted some of the earlier offers he had received for the newsagency, he would have probably still been alive and living in Western Australia in retirement.

Carberry described her brother as a shy and retiring person who didn't consume alcohol, smoke cigarettes, use profanity or pursue romantic relationships. She also said a decision was made to tell their elderly mother only that her son had died but not that he had been murdered due to concerns about how she would react to such news.

== Search for the killer ==
Police immediately commenced a search for the killer and issued appeals to the public on local radio and in local newspapers regarding a suspect who had travelled from Mount Morgan to Rockhampton in a taxi shortly after the murder took place.

Detectives immediately flew from Brisbane to Rockhampton to join the investigation.

The search for the killer was hampered by a number of incidents of people falsely identifying themselves as investigation officers.

An extensive search was undertaken in Brisbane for an armed scar-faced man with a bandaged arm who caught a taxi while claiming to be a detective from Longreach involved with the case. This led to police questioning more than a dozen men with bandaged arms in Brisbane. The police eventually concluded that the bandaged man had no connection with the Dingwall murder.

Another man was arrested and charged with having assumed the designation of a detective while not being member of the police force after questioning men at the Gresham Hotel in Rockhampton. The 32-year-old West Australian man who had been working on a road construction site near Marlborough pleaded guilty, was convicted and fined £3.

== Arrest of Platts ==
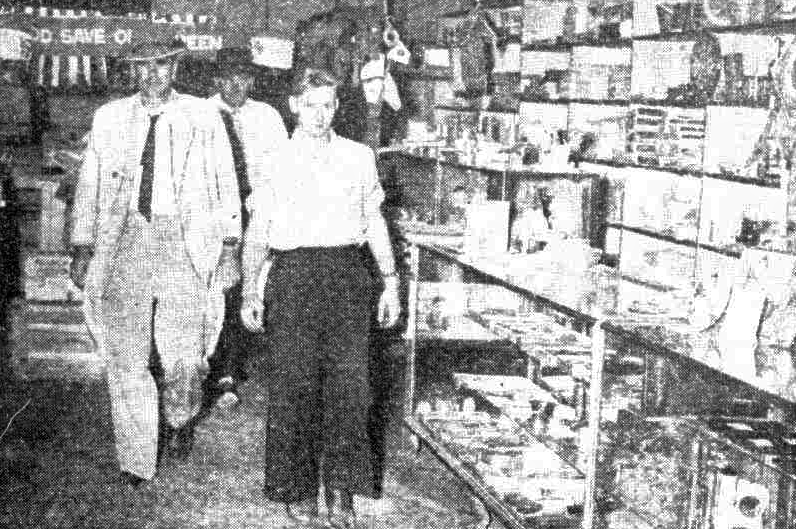
Platts (right) at Dingwall's newsagency with Detective Senior Sergeant Harry Gilbert Cook on the night 31 March 1954

After what was described as "one of the most intensive manhunts in Queensland history", police rushed to Alpha on 30 March 1954 after discovering what was described as a "promising lead".

Patrick Joseph Platts was found on 31 March 1954 near Alpha in Central West Queensland where he had been working.

Although from Mount Morgan, Platts had spent several years in the Alpha district, most recently having been employed as a labourer in a fencing gang for about two years. Police officers from Longreach and Alpha discovered Platts living in a camp 20 miles from Alpha and were joined by detectives who had travelled from Mount Morgan.

During their investigation, police discovered Platts had left Alpha on 18 March 1954 to travel to Rockhampton and had returned on 27 March 1954.

A large amount of stolen money and jewellery was found at the camp. Platts was taken to the Alpha Police Station where he was questioned. Police then accompanied him to the Alpha Post Office where he collected a registered letter which he had sent to himself from Rockhampton which contained more stolen money from the Mount Morgan newsagency.

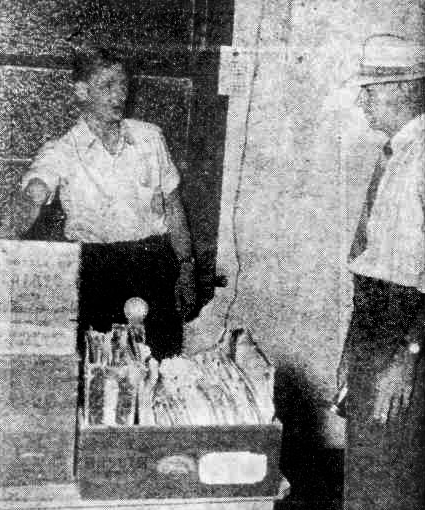
Platts (left) with Sub-Inspector William John Cronau at Dingwall's newsagency on the night of 31 March 1954

The police then brought Platts back to Mount Morgan where they arrived at around 11:20pm on 31 March 1954. Platts was taken to the murder scene, after which he was arrested at the Mount Morgan Police Station at 12:50am on 1 April 1954 for the wilful murder of Andrew Dingwall.

Platts appeared in the Mount Morgan Court of Petty Sessions. His appearance attracted around 70 local Mount Morgan residents who gathered around the Mount Morgan Court House in Hall Street in an attempt to see Dingwall's alleged murderer. Platts was then remanded in custody in Rockhampton for several weeks before several days of evidence were heard in the Court of Petty Sessions.

At the evidence hearing in Mount Morgan, the police alleged that Platts had confessed to the murder after they had recovered items they believed had come from Dingwall's newsagency.

Platts was born in Yeppoon on 23 December 1935 and was one of four children. At a young age, he was sent to St George's Church of England orphanage at Parkhurst where he spent 18 months before attending Mount Morgan Intermediate School, reaching Year 5, and then attending the Mount Morgan Technical College, reaching Year 7 but failing his scholarship.

During his childhood, he appeared in the Children's Court several times charged with various stealing offences. After his father died in 1952, Platts relocated to the Alpha district where he worked a series of jobs including as a fencer, a station hand and on the railway.

== Trial ==
On 30 April 1954, Platts was committed to stand trial in the Rockhampton Supreme Court on a charge of having wilfully murdered Andrew Dingwall.

The trail commenced on 18 May 1954 before Justice Joseph Aloysius Sheehy and a jury of twelve men, where Platts entered a plea of not guilty.

Reginald Francis Carter appeared as the Crown Prosecutor while James Maloney, instructed by Arthur David Cooper, appeared for the defence.

A total of 24 witnesses gave evidence during the trial.

One of the key witnesses was Inspector Thomas Joseph Lloyd from Longreach who told the court that Platts had already confessed to Dingwall's murder and that he had admitted he had travelled from Rockhampton to Mount Morgan on a bus on 20 March 1954 and visited Dingwall's newsagency where he purchased a card while scoping out the premises.

Lloyd said Platts told him that he returned to Rockhampton that day, but caught a late night train at 11:45pm on 21 March 1954 and went back to Mount Morgan where he broke into the newsagency at around 3:00am to steal money. Lloyd told the court that Platts said that he was unaware that Dingwall slept at the back of the premises until he saw him asleep on a mattress and assuming he was asleep attempted to step over him but Dingwall grabbed his leg and began shouting and asking what he was doing there.

Lloyd said Platts then admitted to taking out a sheath knife and stabbing Dingwall multiple times, becoming more frantic as he did so, before taking money, jewellery, and a revolver belonging to Dingwall then washing his hands in a dish, putting on fresh clothes and placing the blood-soaked clothes and the stolen items in a case. According to Lloyd, Platts told him he then left the premises to go to the Mount Morgan telephone exchange where he got an attendant to call a taxi. According to Lloyd, Platts said he told the taxi driver who collected him that he was a railwayman on his way to work in Rockhampton.

Lloyd told the court that Platts had told him that after he reached Rockhampton, he went to the Fitzroy Bridge where he threw the sheath knife into the Fitzroy River before going to the Rockhampton railway station where he consigned the bloodstained clothes and revolver to the Roma Street railway station in Brisbane under the name "J. Neilsen".

Other witnesses to give evidence during the first day of the trail included Detective Senior Sergeant Harry Gilbert Cook from Rockhampton, Detective Sergeant Leslie James Bardwell from Brisbane, senior bacteriologist David Wilbur Smith from the state health department, Alpha grazier Cecil Bowman Chalk, shop assistant Valmai Frances Darwin, and parcels officers from Roma Street railway station, Mitchell Craddock, Clifford Alfred Hansen and Andrew Jamieson Stewart. Rockhampton parcels clerk George Conway Blackford, Platts girlfriend Nellie Lillian Lamb and photographer Leslie John Fulwood also gave evidence.

After the first day of the trial was adjourned, the jury was locked up for the night before it resumed at 10 am the following day.

On the second day of the trial, testimony was heard from Dr John Russell Mair, the government medical officer and medical superintendent of Mount Morgan Hospital who made the post mortem examination of Dingwall. Mair said Dingwall's throat had been cut up to an inch deep and there was 17 stab wounds, six of which had penetrated the chest cavity and three of which had penetrated the lungs which subsequently collapsed. Mair said Dingwall's death was caused by air entering the stab wounds.

Other witnesses included Mount Morgan telephone exchange attendant Cecil Charles Nash, taxi driver Venn Charles Grieve (who drove Platts from Mount Morgan to Rockhampton), trademan's assistant Benjamin Augustine Bunn, Alpha bushman Harry William Palmer, coal trimmer William Nugent (who found Dingwall's body), and Mount Morgan police officer Sergeant Francis Roger Nolan. Evidence was also given by Detective Michael Thomas Hourigan, Constable Leo Henry Watkins, Alpha postal clerk Neil Kelvin Duffy, shop assistant Mona Jean Plunkett and Mount Morgan tailor Douglas Morgan Havig.

No evidence was presented by the defence but did submit that the number of stab wound indicated Platts had panicked, not intending to kill anyone. The defence asked the jury to return the verdict of manslaughter as Platts' intention was to steal from Dingwall's shop without having the knowledge that Dingwall slept on the premises, and that his actions were done out of fear when he "completely lost his head" and failed to know what he was actually doing.

As Crown Prosecutor, Carter told the jury that there were three degrees of unlawful killing where a guilty verdict could be returned (wilful murder, murder and manslaughter) and informed the jury that intentional killing could not only be premeditated but can also occur when a person had not considered killing but had decided to in the circumstances. According to the prosecution, Dingwall had been stabbed so many times, it was reasonable to conclude that the intention was to kill Dingwall.

=== Verdict ===
Following a retirement of almost four hours, the jury filed back into the courtroom at 7:42pm on 19 May 1954 and delivered a guilty verdict, finding Platts guilty of wilful murder. Justice Sheehy said he entirely agreed with the jury's verdict and said there was only one sentence he could impose - life imprisonment with hard labour.

Platts smiled and joked with police officers while he was escorted back to his cell.

He commenced his sentence at Stuart Creek Gaol near Townsville in North Queensland.

=== Appeal ===
Platts attempted to appeal his sentence based on the grounds that his young age was not taken into account and that the court failed to afford him an opportunity to speak before sentencing. However, he was refused leave to appeal the sentence and the application was dismissed in the Court of Criminal Appeal on 8 June 1954 and was described by Chief Justice Neal Macrossan as "frivolous and vexatious." Justices Alan Mansfield and Mostyn Hanger agreed and they unanimously dismissed the application.

== Escape by Platts and Taylor ==
On 11 June 1955, Platts and another prisoner from Central Queensland, housebreaker Stanley Gordon Taylor, both escaped from Stuart Creek Gaol which prompted a widescale search.

Taylor was already notorious for escaping from police custody after using a broken hacksaw blade to cut his way out of a Rockhampton holding gaol on 7 September 1954 - the day before he was due to be transported to Stuart Creek Gaol to begin a three-year hard labour sentence after committing a string of offences.

He had been on the run for nine days after escaping from police custody before being recaptured at gunpoint near Raglan on 16 September 1954.

Platts was eventually recaptured on 29 June 1955 in the kitchen of the homestead on "Curragilla Station", near Prairie, 209 miles west of Townsville. Platts had gained work on the property as a stationhand until manager Jack Martyn informed the police of his whereabouts after seeing a photo of Platts in a newspaper during a trip to Hughenden.

Platts was arrested as he sat down to breakfast with the manager. Despite insisting his name was Elwell John Boyce, Platts was handcuffed and taken back to Hughenden before being transported back to Townsville on a train with two armed police officers. Their arrival at the Townsville railway station attracted a crowd of about 50 people who gathered on the platform to see Platts being escorted from a special compartment at the rear of the train.

During the train journey, Platts revealed Taylor had deserted him just half an hour after their escape from prison and said he had wandered around Townsville for about four days before walking barefoot to Charters Towers and then "jumping" a train to Hughenden.

While Platts was back in custody, the search for Taylor continued which was hindered by an anonymous hoax call to the police claiming he was in a house in the Brisbane suburb of Morningside which resulted in an unsuccessful dawn raid.

The search for Taylor led police back to the Alpha district where his fellow escapee had been located the previous year after murdering Dingwall.

Taylor was recaptured near Alpha on 14 July 1955 near the Islay Plains homestead, where he surrendered without any struggle after being four days without food. He was transported back to Rockhampton and then returned to Townsville.

In the Townsville Supreme Court on 9 August 1955, Platts was sentenced to 18 months gaol while Taylor was sentenced to three and a half years gaol on three charges to which he pleaded guilty.

Platts and Taylor were handcuffed together during their court appearance and were accompanied in the courtroom by five uniformed officers.

The escape from Stuart Creek Gaol prompted the Queensland Government to hold an inquiry, investigating the administration of the facility. Attorney-General William Power asked Michael John Hickey SM to conduct the inquiry.

The inquiry commenced at the gaol on 25 July 1955.

It concluded in August 1955, after which Hickey made several recommendations.

According to electoral rolls, after Platts served his sentence he briefly lived in the Brisbane suburb of Norman Park before moving back north where he lived in Flaggy Rock throughout the 1970s and then in Mackay from 1980.

Platts died on 31 March 2011.

== Murder phobia case ==
Platts' 1954 murder of Andrew Dingwall indirectly contributed to another killing at Wowan in 1972.

After Platts killed Dingwall, local 10-year-old boy Edward Brown developed foniasophobia - a phobia of being murdered.

The phobia suffered by Brown led to him killing Bernard "Whacker" Kirton on 3 March 1972 by shooting him. In that case, Brown pleaded not guilty of murder but guilty of manslaughter on the grounds of diminished responsibility.

The Crown accepted Brown's manslaughter plea and withdrew the charge of murder.

At the conclusion of the two-day trial in Brisbane, Justice Charles Wanstall accepted the psychiatric evidence that Brown was in a state of severe phobic anxiety when he killed Kirton.

A psychiatrist told the court Brown's murder phobia stemmed from a restricted home life and fears which commenced when Platts murdered Dingwall in 1954 which had grown to the extent that Brown believed murderers were at large in the community.

By 1972, Platts had been released from gaol and was living with a family at Flaggy Rock.

After being held on remand in Boggo Road Gaol, Brown was released on two years probation subject to him seeking psychiatric treatment.

However, he remained in Brisbane for a time to undergo psychiatric treatment. Highly regarded in the Wowan community, Brown's release was met with plaudits from the town where Brown was captain of the local polocrosse team and was involved with the local show society and pony club.

In an interview with Brisbane's Sunday Sun newspaper following his release, Brown explained that hearing accounts of the 1954 murder as a young child had been the trigger for his phobia which had haunted him ever since.

According to Brown, Kirton had been taunting him for 18 months and then visited his home on 3 March 1972 where he began yelling abuse through his car window. Brown said he grabbed his gun for his own protection but doesn't remember firing it.

In the interview, Brown said he had not only had to conquer his phobia, but also come to terms that it had led to him killing someone.
