= Ithaca Town Council Chambers =

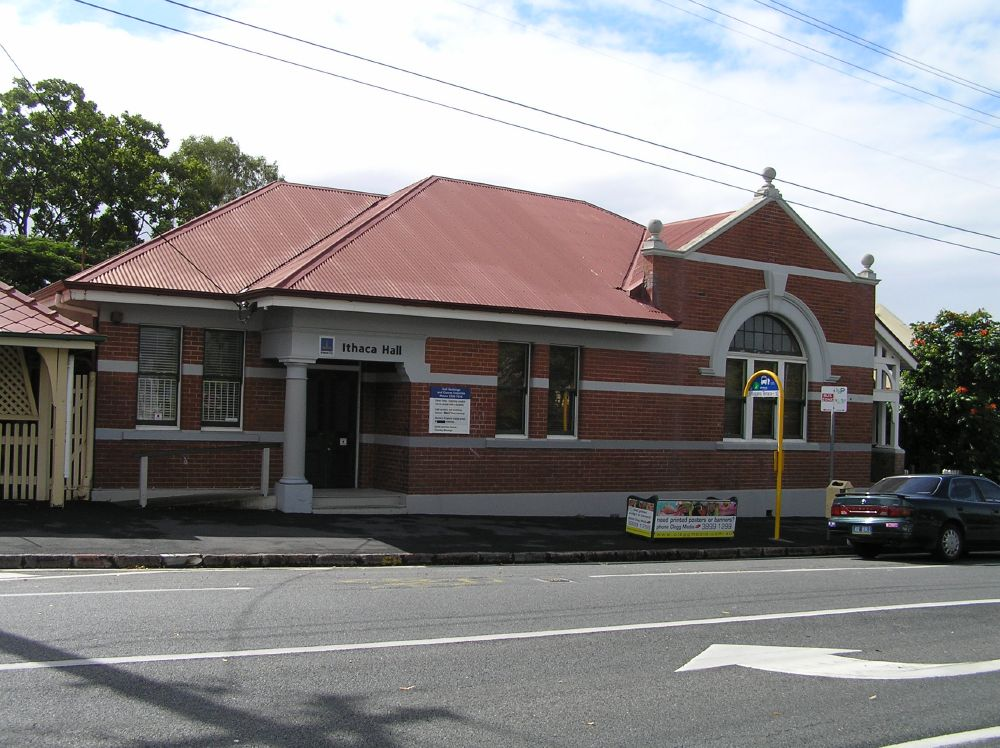
- Ithaca Town Council Chambers, 2009

- Location within Queensland Location within Australia
- 27.4559°S 153.0015°E
- Location: 99 Enoggera Terrace, Red Hill, City of Brisbane, Queensland, Australia

History
- Design period: 1900–1914 (early 20th century)
- Built: 1910
- Built for: Ithaca Town Council

Site notes
- Architect: Atkinson and McLay

Queensland Heritage Register
- Official name: Ithaca Town Council Chambers and Red Hill Kindergarten (former), Ithaca Library
- Type: state heritage (built)
- Designated: 24 March 2000
- Reference no.: 602058
- Significant period: 1910–1925 (historical); 1910–ongoing (social); 1910s (fabric council chambers); 1920s–1930s (fabric)
- Significant components: office/s, shed – shelter, strong room, hall, furniture/fittings, council chamber/meeting room, views to
- Builders: Charles Thomas Hall and Francis Joseph Mayer

The Ithaca Town Council Chambers is a heritage-listed former town hall of the former local government area of the Town of Ithaca, and now a community centre in Paddington, City of Brisbane, Queensland, Australia. Located at 99 Enoggera Terrace (on the corner with Kennedy Terrace), Red Hill, it was designed by Atkinson and McLay and built in 1910 by Charles Thomas Hall and Francis Joseph Mayer. It is also known as Ithaca Library and Red Hill Kindergarten. It was added to the Queensland Heritage Register on 24 March 2000.

In 2013, it was owned by Communify, a not-for-profit community group, who rent out the building for community activities.

== History ==
Prominently situated on Enoggera Terrace, the former Ithaca Town Council Chambers comprises the Ithaca Library and Red Hill Kindergarten. Completed in 1910, the former Chambers were designed by Brisbane architects Henry Wallace Atkinson and Charles McLay, and built by Charles Thomas Hall and Francis Joseph Mayer.

=== Town of Ithaca ===
The Municipality of Brisbane was proclaimed on 7 September 1859, shortly before the Separation of Queensland from New South Wales in December of that year. Although individual settlements such as Fortitude Valley, Kangaroo Point and South Brisbane agitated for separate municipality status, it was not until the Local Government Authorities Act of 1878 and the Divisional Boards Act of 1879 that a series of local authorities were created in the Brisbane Metropolitan area.

The Division of Ithaca was proclaimed in 1879, and was named after the birthplace of Lady Diamantina Bowen, wife of Queensland's first Governor, George Bowen. Ithaca comprised most of the western suburbs of Brisbane from Kelvin Grove Road to Mount Coot-tha and the head of Kelvin Grove Brook. An area just before the junction of Waterworks Road and Kelvin Grove Road formed the southeastern extremity of the Division.

The Ithaca Division was proclaimed Shire of Ithaca in 1887, and eventually a Town on 19 August 1903.

=== Council Chambers ===
In 1900 the Ithaca Shire Council purchased subdivisions 131 to 133 on Enoggera Terrace, at the corner of Kennedy Terrace, considered by the Council to be a prominent and central location within the shire from which to conduct municipal business. Although plans had previously been drawn up, architects Henry Wallace Atkinson and Charles McLay were commissioned to prepare plans for a suitable hall in brick and in wood in 1909. Atkinson and McLay practiced in partnership from 1907 until McLay's death in 1918. Prior to working in private practice, both Atkinson and McLay worked for the Department of Public Works during the late nineteenth century.

Tenders for the new Council Chambers (in brick) for the Ithaca Town Council were invited in October 1909; that of Charles Thomas Hall and Francis Joseph Mayer for £1149 was accepted, but reduced to £1100 with the removal of certain embellishments from the plans. The building was completed in 1910.

The new council chambers were officially opened on Saturday 19 March 1910 with a dinner for approximately 100 guests hosted by the mayor.

The Council Chambers fronted Enoggera Terrace, with the main entrance at the southern end of the building. In addition to the Council Chamber, the building provided offices for the Town Clerk, Accountant, Mayor and Engineer, and included a strongroom. A second entrance was provided at the northern end of the building. An internal staircase led to an earth closet, lavatory and tool store downstairs. The plans indicated a future extension of the building along the Kennedy Terrace frontage; a modified version of which appears to have been carried out with the extension of the building to accommodate the kindergarten during the 1950s. Signage on the building and a flagpole had been added to the building by 1919.

Enoggera Terrace was also used by trams. The tram line extended along Enoggera Terrace to the terminus at the corner of Kennedy Terrace in 1902, and was extended to its terminus at Federal Street in 1904. During the 1920s/30s a tram shelter was erected adjacent to the front of the former Council Chambers, to a standard Brisbane City Council design.

In May 1925, burglars attempted to break into the council's strongroom using high explosives to break through the reinforced concrete floor, but the noise attracted attention and they fled without stealing anything.

=== Brisbane City Council era ===
The building served as the town's headquarters until 1925, when the Town of Ithaca was absorbed into the City of Brisbane. After this, the Brisbane City Council used the building and grounds partly as a Council depot until 1961.

During the 1940s the Red Hill Community Centre was established in the former Council Chambers by TR Groom (later Lord Mayor of Brisbane from 1955 to 1961) and other community members. The Centre included a library in the former offices of the Mayor and Engineer, known as the Ithaca District Community Library, which became a branch of the Brisbane City Library in 1947. A kindergarten established in 1947 made use of the former Chamber. The former Chamber was also hired out for various community activities such as dancing classes, wedding receptions and Liberal Party meetings.

The library was taken over by the Council in 1946/47 by which time it occupied the former Chamber, and was renamed the Ithaca District Municipal Library. Although plans were prepared c. 1946 for a proposed gymnasium and club room at the rear of the building, these additions did not eventuate.

In 1954, an extension was built at the rear of the building to provide additional space for the kindergarten.

Additional space in the building was required by the early 1950s; a large extension to the west of the building was completed by 1954 and used for kindergarten classrooms. In 1959 the Kindergarten was formally inaugurated as the Enoggera Terrace Community Association – Kindergarten. Further need for space during the early 1960s resulted in the Kindergarten taking over the former Council Works Department sheds in the grounds, and the space underneath the building (the Council no longer using it as a depot) whilst the Library took over some of the Kindergarten space. Successive leases have required the occupants of the building to carry out improvements; consequently the building has undergone a series of minor changes and alterations.

The library was closed in 1998, and the former library space is now used as a venue for community groups and community meetings. The toilets at the rear of the former Chambers have been altered, and a new adult toilet provided in the Kindergarten. The former Works Department sheds and the flagpole at the front of the building are no longer extant (February 2000).

=== Fate of other town halls in Brisbane ===
Only some of the twenty "town halls" that existed at the time of Greater Brisbane in 1925 are still extant (November 2014):

- Coorparoo Shire Hall
- Hamilton Town Hall
- Ithaca Town Council Chambers
- Sandgate Town Hall
- South Brisbane Municipal Chambers (commonly known as the South Brisbane Town Hall)
- Stephens Shire Offices (now a private residence)
- Toombul Shire Hall
- Windsor Shire Council Chambers

== Description ==
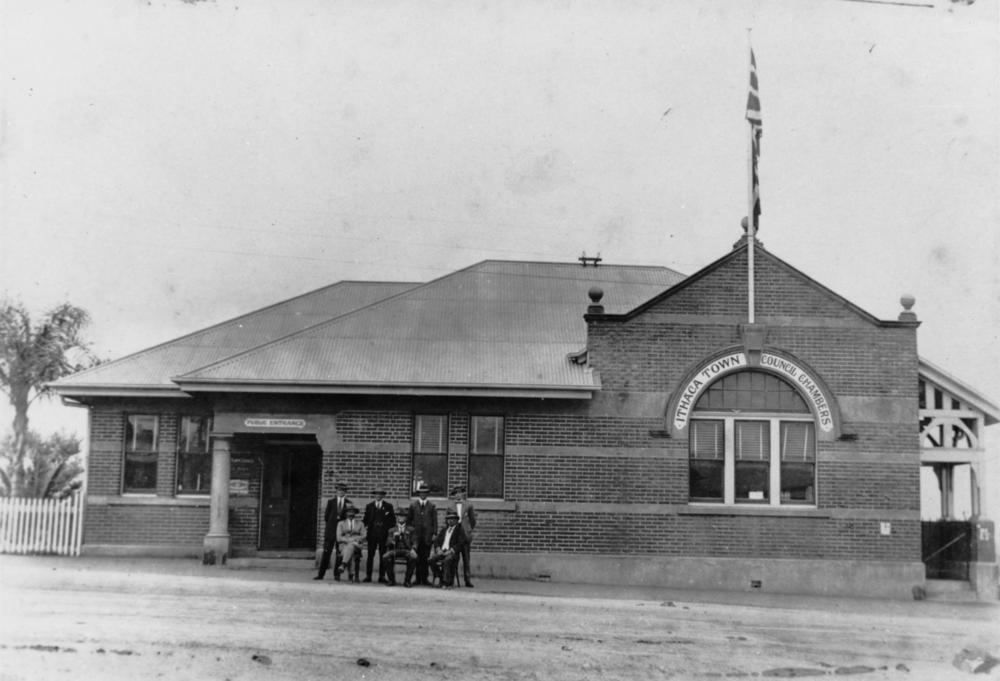
Ithaca Town Council Chambers, 1919

Prominently located at the corner of Enoggera Terrace and Kennedy Terrace, the former Ithaca Town Council Chambers comprises the original single storey brick Council Chambers and a two storeyed timber extension attached to the south west corner of the Council Chambers. The extension, which fronts Kennedy Terrace, is generally obscured from view by several mature trees in the grounds. With the exception of two rooms, the former Council Chambers are used as a community hall. The former Clerk's room and the former Accountant's room, together with the extension, comprise the Red Hill Kindergarten. A shelter shed, is situated adjacent to the southern end of the Council Chambers, and fronts Enoggera Terrace.

The former Council Chambers is a single storeyed, hip roofed building with a basement. The external walls are brick with contrasting rendered elements including linear banding and ornamental framing around openings. Two entry porches of different design and materials to distinguish the former public entry and the former main entry, are located at the northern and southern ends of the building respectively.

The timber framed shelter shed includes a diamond pattern shingle roof and terracotta ornaments. The shelter shed is open on all sides, and is divided lengthways by a lattice panel which separates the public seating on the street side from the kindergarten entrance at the rear of the structure.

Generally rectangular in plan, the former Council Chambers is accessed via a decorative timber and brick entry porch at the northern end of the building, which leads into the original chamber space. The southern wall of the chamber has been partially removed, and the removal of the wall between the Mayor's room and the Engineer's room creates a large open space approximately twice the size of the original chamber, now a community hall. The original pressed metal ceilings are generally intact and this, together with evidence of former openings, indicates the original organisation of the rooms. Modern fluorescent lighting is suspended from the ceilings of the Mayor's room and the former Engineer's room.

A small kitchen is located in a separate room on the northern side of the hall. A door at the rear of the hall leads to a verandah, the northern end of which is enclosed as a toilet and bathroom, whilst the southern end leads to the kindergarten extension.

Formerly the main entrance to the building, the southern entry porch includes a single rendered column. A sign above the porch identifies the building as "Ithaca Hall". A set of double doors with coloured glass panels opens into a hallway, and a staircase at the end of the hallway leads down to the basement. The basement generally comprises a series of storage and amenities spaces. The hallway also provides access from the hall into the Clerk's room and the Accountant's room which are now used as part of the kindergarten space.

The Red Hill Kindergarten is accessed via a separate entry off Kennedy Terrace, through the space behind the shelter shed. This entry space is paved, and has been covered with a pergola type structure and enclosed by a high timber fence. The former Clerk's room is used as the kindergarten Director's office, whilst the former Accountant's room is used as the kindergarten kitchen. The original Council vault and vault door remain intact in the kitchen. A skylight has been inserted through the ceiling of the kitchen.

The two storeyed timber extension which adjoins the south west corner of the original building provides classroom space for the kindergarten on both levels. An area on the south eastern side of the extension has been converted to provide an adult toilet and bathroom.

== Heritage listing ==
The former Ithaca Town Council Chambers were listed on the Queensland Heritage Register on 24 March 2000 having satisfied the following criteria.

The place is important in demonstrating the evolution or pattern of Queensland's history.

The former Ithaca Town Council Chambers provides evidence of the growth and development of Ithaca during the early twentieth century. Owned by the Brisbane City Council following the formation of Greater Brisbane in 1925, the former Ithaca Town Council Chambers is also important in demonstrating the development of local government in Brisbane. The tram shelter shed adjacent to the former Ithaca Town Council Chambers provides evidence of the extension of public transport services through Ithaca during the early twentieth century.

The place is important because of its aesthetic significance.

With its prominent location at the corner of Enoggera and Kennedy Terraces and its clearly articulated facades with modest decorative detailing, the former Ithaca Town Council Chambers, and adjacent tram shelter, makes an important contribution to the Enoggera Terrace streetscape.

The place has a strong or special association with a particular community or cultural group for social, cultural or spiritual reasons.

Erected in 1910 for the Ithaca Town Council, and extended in the 1950s, the former Ithaca Town Council Chambers and kindergarten extension continue to have a strong association with the Red Hill/Paddington community as a focal point for social and community functions.
