= Atkinson and Conrad =

Atkinson and Conrad was an architectural partnership in Brisbane, Queensland, Australia between Henry Wallace Atkinson and Arnold Henry Conrad. Many of their works are now heritage-listed.

== History ==
In 1889, while working as a draughtsman in the office of the Queensland Colonial Architect, Henry Atkinson submitted an entry into a competition for a new Head Fire Station on the corner of Ann and Edward Streets in Brisbane. Having won the competition, he left the Queensland Public Service and started his own private practice. The Head Fire Station was completed in December 1890 but has since been demolished. However, his architectural practice has continued through a series of partnerships.

In 1907, he took Charles McLay as his partner creating Atkinson and McLay. That partnership lasted until 1918, when McLay died. Atkinson then partnered with Arnold Henry Conrad (who had joined the firm in 1907) to create Atkinson and Conrad which lasted from 1918 until 1939 (Atkinson having died in 1938).

In 2015, the practice founded by Henry Atkinson is known as Conrad Gargett.

The University of Queensland Library holds many architectural drawings by Atkinson and his practice.

== Works ==
Works of Atkinson and Conrad include:

Atkinson and Conrad

- former Balmoral Fire Station (1926)
- Brisbane Boys College (1930)
- former Coorparoo Fire Station (1935)
- former Wynnum Fire Station (1922–1938)

See also Category:Atkinson & Conrad buildings.
