= Stewart's Creek Gaol =

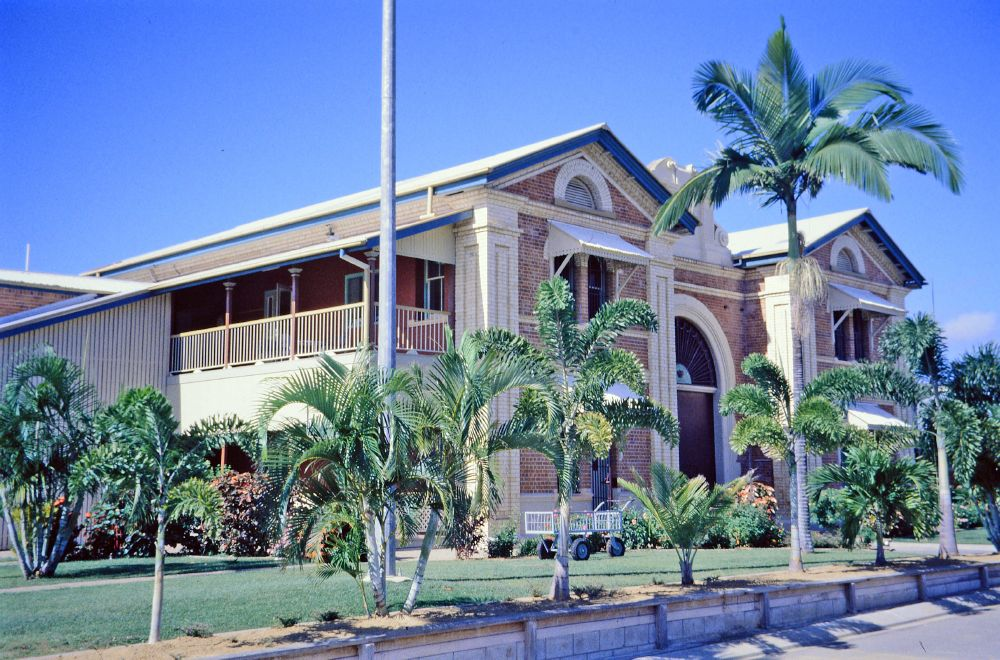
- Stewart's Creek Gaol gatehouse, 2000

- Location within Queensland Location within Australia
- 19.3509°S 146.8464°E
- Location: Centenary Drive, off Dwyer Street, Stuart, City of Townsville, Queensland, Australia

Site notes
- Architect: Office of the Queensland Colonial Architect

Queensland Heritage Register
- Official name: Stewart's Creek Gaol (former), Townsville Correctional Centre
- Type: state heritage (built)
- Designated: 31 July 2008
- Reference no.: 601250
- Significant period: 1890s (historical); 1890s (fabric); 1893-present (social)
- Builders: Thomas Matthews

Stewart's Creek Gaol is a heritage-listed prison at Centenary Drive, off Dwyer Street, Stuart, City of Townsville, Queensland, Australia. It was designed by the Office of the Queensland Colonial Architect and built from 1890 to 1893 by Thomas Matthews. It is the predecessor of the modern Townsville Correctional Centre on the same site. It was added to the Queensland Heritage Register on 31 July 2008.

== History ==
The original Stewart's Creek Gaol, of which the Gatehouse and Central Observation Tower are now the principal surviving elements, was constructed in 1890–1893, to plans prepared c. 1889 in the office of the Queensland Colonial Architect, George St Paul Connolly. Charles McLay was the principal designer in the office at this time. The gaol was erected by contractor Thomas Matthews at a cost of £31,600.

The gaol was intended to function as the principal prison in north Queensland. It was the only maximum-security prison established in North Queensland in the nineteenth century, ranking alongside St Helena Gaol (opened in 1866), the Rockhampton Gaol at North Street (1876–1878), and the South Brisbane Men's Prison at Boggo Road (opened 1883). As well as providing a maximum-security gaol in the north, the Stewart's Creek Gaol helped relieve overcrowding at Boggo Road and St Helena and also reduced the expensive and dangerous necessity of escorting convicted north Queensland felons to these southern establishments.

The decision to erect a major gaol facility at Stewart's Creek (later Stuart Creek) on the outskirts of Townsville reflected the rapid rise of Townsville as a regional administrative and commercial centre and port. The town was founded in 1864 at the beginning of a period of rapid expansion in north Queensland, fuelled largely by pastoral activity, gold mining and sugar industry. Between 1867 and 1910, Townsville grew rapidly to become the north's main commercial centre and port.

The Stewart's Creek Gaol replaced an earlier Townsville Gaol, completed c. 1864 at North Ward. By the second half of the 1880s the North Ward gaol was proving unsuitable in terms of its location and design. With the expansion of suburban Townsville, local residents began to complain that the prison was located too close to the centre of town. The gaol was also chronically overcrowded, making it difficult to maintain adequate separation and classification of prisoners. In 1889 the Prisons Department took up 150 acres of ground near Stewart's Creek and the Colonial Architect's office was requested to prepare plans for a new prison.

The site chosen for the construction of the new gaol was a former sheep quarantine ground, located approximately eight kilometres from town. The new gaol buildings were sited conveniently near the Great Northern Railway, which made possible the rapid and easy transit of prisoners and supplies to and from Townsville.

The contract for construction of the gaol was let on 8 April 1890 to Thomas Matthews, and the buildings were occupied in 1893. The gatehouse (extant) comprised Governor's quarters and Chief Turnkey's quarters flanking a main front gate. This gave access to a central circulation space and muster ground bounded on the north and south sides by two administration buildings (no longer extant). Beyond these buildings were the three main cell blocks (no longer extant). These were configured in a semi-radial pattern, to allow for the construction of additional wings if required. Earlier Queensland prison designs, such as Boggo Road (completed 1883), had utilized a more restrictive cruciform arrangement of cell blocks. An underground tank of 66,000 gallons (300 kl) capacity was constructed for rainwater, which was pumped to high level tanks for the supply of the various buildings. The buildings were constructed of brick on concrete foundations, and the whole of the complex was enclosed by a six-metre-high (20-foot) concrete wall (no longer extant).

Stewart's Creek Gaol was occupied in 1893 by male prisoners previously confined at the Townsville Gaol at North Ward. The majority of prisoners confined at Mackay Gaol were also transferred to Stewart's Creek, and the Mackay Gaol was then closed. Female prisoners at the North Ward were transferred a few years later, when associated infrastructure was in place.

The prominent Central Observation Tower was designed in 1897 by John Smith Murdoch, employed in the Queensland Colonial Architect's Office. Murdoch later had a prominent career in the Commonwealth Works Department, where he was appointed Chief Architect by 1919 and was involved with the planning of Canberra and the design of its provisional Parliament House (now Old Parliament House). The structure is known locally as the "Trig Tower" because trigonometrical survey readings are taken from it.

In the late 1960s a new medium security block, the first of its type in north Queensland, was constructed south of the existing prison on the site of the former prison piggery. When completed in 1967 the new prison provided accommodation for up to 192 prisoners.

The original maximum-security prison was redeveloped in the 1990s as the Townsville Correctional Centre. When works were completed in 1996 much of the original prison was demolished, including the cell blocks and the perimeter wall, the latter replaced by a state-of-the-art razor wire fence. The original Administration Buildings were also demolished.

The early 1890s Gatehouse and the 1897 Observation Tower were refurbished in 1995–1996. The interior of the Gatehouse was renovated with the provision of office space and administrative areas. The exterior was reconstructed to its original design with open verandahs and latticework, and non-original fixtures and accretions were removed.

== Description ==
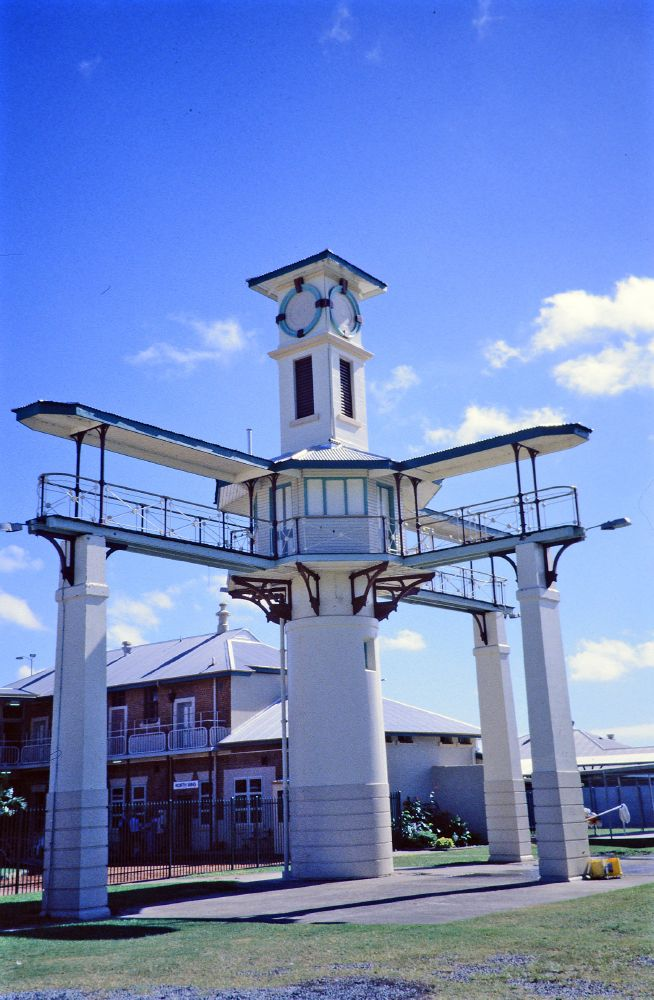
Stewart's Creek Gaol watchtower, 2000

The Townsville Correctional Centre is a walled facility situated on a much larger prison reserve of 677 hectares on Centenary Drive, off Dwyer Street, Stuart. The structures associated with the former Stewart's Creek Gaol, which include the former Gatehouse and the Central Observation Tower, are located within the Townsville Correctional Centre, adjacent to more recently erected gaol buildings.

The former Gatehouse is a two-storeyed, symmetrically designed, red brick structure in the classical tradition comprising a central gate with wings (now used for offices) on either side. It is built in red brick with rendered pilasters at the corners of each wing. The wings are divided by cream coloured brick string courses above the lower windows and below the first floor windows. The steel-barred windows are surmounted by corrugated iron and timber window hoods. Arched vents in cream coloured brick are set into the eaves of the gabled roof above each wing. Verandahs at both storeys extend from the sides. Short lengths of the original prison wall extend from each wing.

The main gate is located in the centre of a recessed bay between the two outer wings of the building. The steel gate is surmounted by large fanlight with wrought iron infill. The gate and fanlight are surrounded by cream brick moulding. The whole bay is surmounted by an ornate concrete pediment decorated with scrolls and the date of construction of the building. The gate opens into a concourse, the full two storeys in height, which runs through to the rear of the building. The concourse ends at a large rear gate. This opening is very similar to the one at the front except that a barred steel gate is used instead of solid steel.

Much of the interior of the Gatehouse has been altered to accommodate offices, however a number of original features remain. These include fireplaces, internal security doors and vent covers.

The Central Observation Tower is located some distance behind the Gate House. It is a tall cylindrical structure surmounted by an octagonal cabin. The cabin is surrounded by a covered walkway and three covered walkways project from it at right angles to each other. Wrought iron balustrades enclose all of the walkways. They are roofed with corrugated iron. The walkway that surrounds the cabin is supported by wrought iron brackets. Those that extend from the cabin are supported by one pillar each. These are square in cross-section and taper slightly towards the top.

Access is gained into the tower via a narrow door at the base. A spiral staircase ascends the interior of the tower to the cabin. The cabin is clad with weatherboard. Doors open onto each of the three projecting walkways. A set of three windows open from each of the other five sides. The interior is furnished with a lavatory and wash basin.

The tower extends upwards out of the roof of the cabin. This section of tower is square in cross-section. A projecting molding surrounds it at about two-thirds of its height. Tall narrow vents open into each side below this molding. A molded circle reminiscent of a clock decorates each side of the tower near the top. A small pyramid roof of corrugated iron covers the top of the tower.

== Heritage listing ==
The remnants of the Stewart's Creek Gaol were listed on the Queensland Heritage Register on 31 July 2008 having satisfied the following criteria.

The place is important in demonstrating the evolution or pattern of Queensland's history.

The early surviving structures associated with the former Stewart's Creek Gaol (including Gatehouse and Central Observation Tower), erected during the 1890s, are important in demonstrating the evolution of nineteenth century prison design and operation in Queensland. They also demonstrate the pattern of settlement in Queensland, in particular, the important role Townsville played as a regional administration centre at the time.

The place demonstrates rare, uncommon or endangered aspects of Queensland's cultural heritage.

The former Stewart's Creek Gaol Gatehouse (1890–1893) and the Central Observation Tower (or Trig Tower) (1897), are the oldest surviving intact prison buildings in Queensland. The Gatehouse pre-dates the former Women's Prison at Boggo Road in Brisbane (c. 1903) (Boggo Road Gaol), by about a decade. They provide rare surviving physical evidence of late nineteenth century approaches to prison design and administration in Queensland.

Queensland's other main surviving nineteenth century prison, St Helena in Moreton Bay, survives in a ruinous condition and illustrates earlier attitudes to prison design and administration.

The place is important in demonstrating the principal characteristics of a particular class of cultural places.

The place remains important in illustrating some of the principal characteristics of late nineteenth century prison design, including construction of a forbidding entrance (gatehouse) and central observation tower.

The Central Observation Tower is a fine example of the design skills of architect John Smith Murdoch, who later had a distinguished career in the Commonwealth Department of Works.

The place is important because of its aesthetic significance.

The Gatehouse is a well composed design in the classical tradition displaying a pleasing symmetry and a high degree of legibility. The imposing, steel main gate is highly evocative of the penal function of the building.
