= Atkinson and McLay =

Australian architecture company

Atkinson and McLay was an architectural partnership in Brisbane, Queensland, Australia. It produced a number of significant works and is the origins of one of Brisbane's major architectural firms in the present day.

== History ==
The partnership between Henry Wallace Atkinson and Charles McLay was established in 1907. The practice subsequently assumed the position of Diocesan Architect to the Anglican Diocese of Brisbane, designing a number of schools and churches in South East Queensland. The partnership lasted until McLay's death in 1918. However, the firm continued to remain prominent in Queensland, evolving into the present day firm of Conrad Gargett.

== Significant works ==
- 1910: Ithaca Town Council Chambers
