= Charles McLay =

Scottish-born architect in Australia

Charles McLay (circa 1860 – 2 May 1918) was a Scottish-born architect in Queensland, Australia. Some of his works are now heritage-listed.

== Architectural career ==
After working for a number of years in the Public Works Department in the Queensland Government Architect's Office, McLay entered into a partnership with Henry Wallace Atkinson in 1906, trading as Atkinson and McLay.

== Other interests ==
McLay joined the Naval Defence Force as a sub-lieutenant on 6 May 1898 and was promoted to lieutenant on 31 October 1901. He was commander when he was placed on the retired list of the Australian Naval Brigade on 15 January 1910. Following the resignation of Robin Dods, McLay was appointed Diocesan Architect to the Anglican Diocese of Brisbane in 1916; it passed to Atkinson after McLay's death in 1918.

== Later life ==
McLay died suddenly at his home on 2 May 1918. His funeral was held on 3 May 1918 and he was buried in Bulimba Cemetery.

== Significant works ==
- 1886: Customs House, Brisbane
- 1889: Stewart's Creek Gaol, in the Queensland Colonial Architect's Office
- 1890–1891: Queensport Hotel (now Queensport Tavern), 49 Gibson Road, Murarrie (27.4404°S 153.1302°E)
- 1895: Lady Norman Wing of the Brisbane General Hospital, with John James Clark
- 1895–1896: Nazareth Lutheran Church, Woolloongabba
- 1910: Ithaca Town Council Chambers, as Atkinson and McLay
- 1912: McWhirters Department Store, as Atkinson and McLay
- 1916: Bandstand at Eagle Farm Racecourse, as Atkinson and McLay

== See also ==
- List of Australian architects
