= Windsor War Memorial Park =

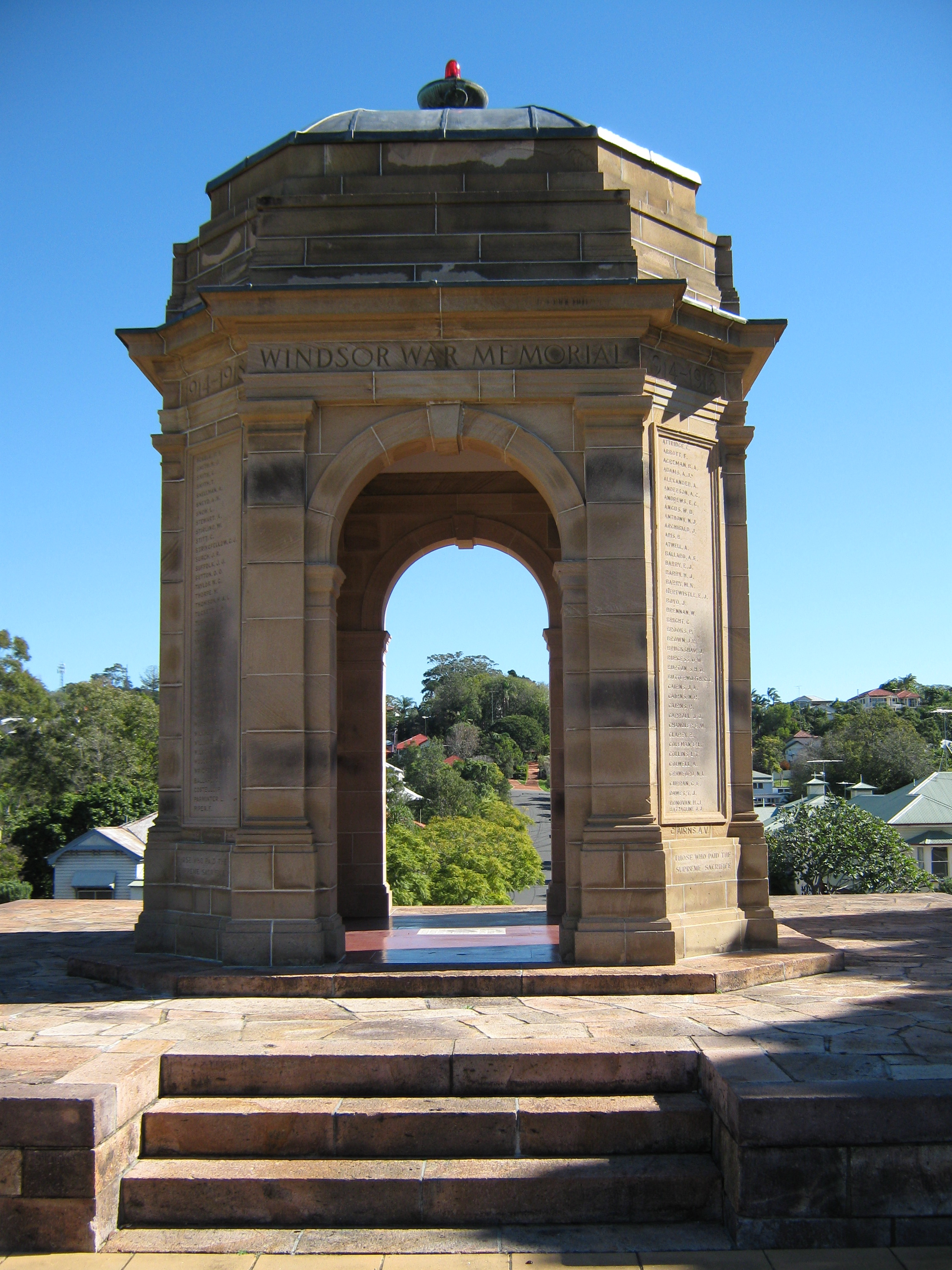
- Windsor War Memorial, 2008

- Location within Queensland Location within Australia
- 27.4308°S 153.0322°E
- Location: 311 Lutwyche Road, Windsor, City of Brisbane, Queensland, Australia

History
- Design period: 1919–1930s (interwar period)
- Built: 1925

Queensland Heritage Register
- Official name: Windsor War Memorial Park
- Type: state heritage (built, landscape)
- Designated: 21 October 1992
- Reference no.: 600350
- Significant period: 1925–1930s (fabric); 1925– (social)
- Significant components: wall/s – retaining, trees/plantings, memorial – pavilion, park / green space

Windsor War Memorial Park is a heritage-listed park with war memorial at 311 Lutwyche Road, Windsor, City of Brisbane, Queensland, Australia. It was built in 1925. It was added to the Queensland Heritage Register on 21 October 1992.

== History ==
The Windsor War Memorial was erected on behalf of the citizens of the Town of Windsor to commemorate local residents who had served in the First World War. It was unveiled on Anzac Day, 25 April 1925 by Charles Taylor, the Member of the Queensland Legislative Assembly for Windsor. William Jolly, Mayor of Brisbane, and Henry Bond, mayor of the Town of Windsor were also in attendance.

Costing around £1,300, the memorial was based on an initial concept by ex-alderman McDonald. It was constructed by contractor Peter Frew to a design prepared by honorary architects Francis Richard Hall and WA Devereux.

The octagonal pavilion is rare among Queensland's First World War memorials. Yeronga War Memorial (1921) is its closest Brisbane equivalent.

The surrounding park existed prior to the construction of the memorial. It was the site of the former Bowen Bridge State School from 1865 until the latter burnt down about 1914, after which the school reserve was ceded unofficially to the Windsor Town Council for park use. Despite landscaping, erection of the memorial, and public recognition of the Windsor Memorial Park, it was not declared a park reserve until 1930.

== Description ==
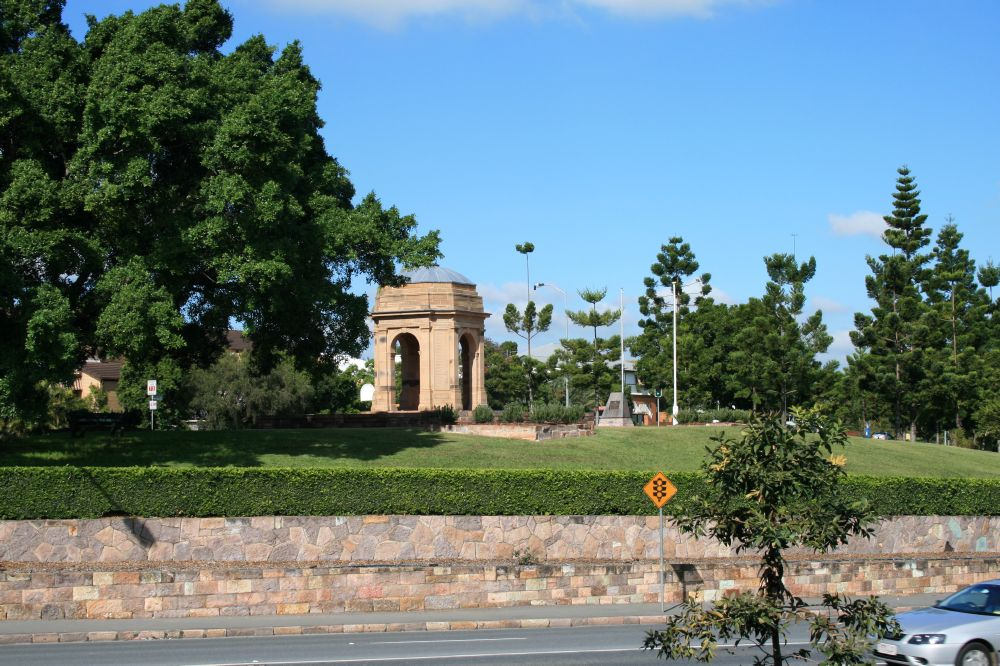
Windsor War Memorial Park, 2009

The Windsor War Memorial stands on the highest point of a park situated between Lutwyche Road and Roblane Street, Windsor.

The memorial is an octagonal, pavilion-type structure and is constructed of brown Helidon sandstone. It rests on a wide podium of locally quarried Brisbane tuff, with steps at each face.

The memorial has arches on four sides, and on the external corner panels are inscribed the names, originally gilt, of those who died in the war. Inscribed lettering forms a frieze around the entablature, and the whole is surmounted by a cupola and a bronze lantern with a red electric light.

Inside, the concrete floor is painted red and blue, and features a leaded marble commemorative plaque in the centre. The circular ceiling is ornamented with a moulded laurel wreath.

The area immediately surrounding the memorial has been asphalted, but the remainder of the park is grassed and planted with large, mature trees and shrubs. Pink oleanders form a hedge along Lutwyche Road, above stone retaining walls.

Apart from the removal of an inter-war timber bandstand, both park and memorial remain substantially intact. They retain a prominent position in the Windsor townscape, standing on a principal arterial entry to the city and adjacent to the former Windsor Town Council Chambers (1896–1897).

== Heritage listing ==
Windsor War Memorial Park was listed on the Queensland Heritage Register on 21 October 1992 having satisfied the following criteria.

The place is important in demonstrating the evolution or pattern of Queensland's history.

Windsor War Memorial Park is significant as a member of a class of commemorative structures erected as a record of the local impact of a major historical event and intended to endure.

Windsor War Memorial Park is significant as a rare and intact example of pavilion-type war memorial.

Windsor War Memorial Park is significant for its landmark quality and contribution to the Windsor townscape.

The place demonstrates rare, uncommon or endangered aspects of Queensland's cultural heritage.

Windsor War Memorial Park is significant as a rare and intact example of pavilion-type war memorial.

The place is important in demonstrating the principal characteristics of a particular class of cultural places.

Windsor War Memorial Park is significant as a member of a class of commemorative structures erected as a record of the local impact of a major historical event and intended to endure.

The place is important because of its aesthetic significance.

Windsor War Memorial Park is significant for its landmark quality and contribution to the Windsor townscape.
