= Windsor Shire Council Chambers =

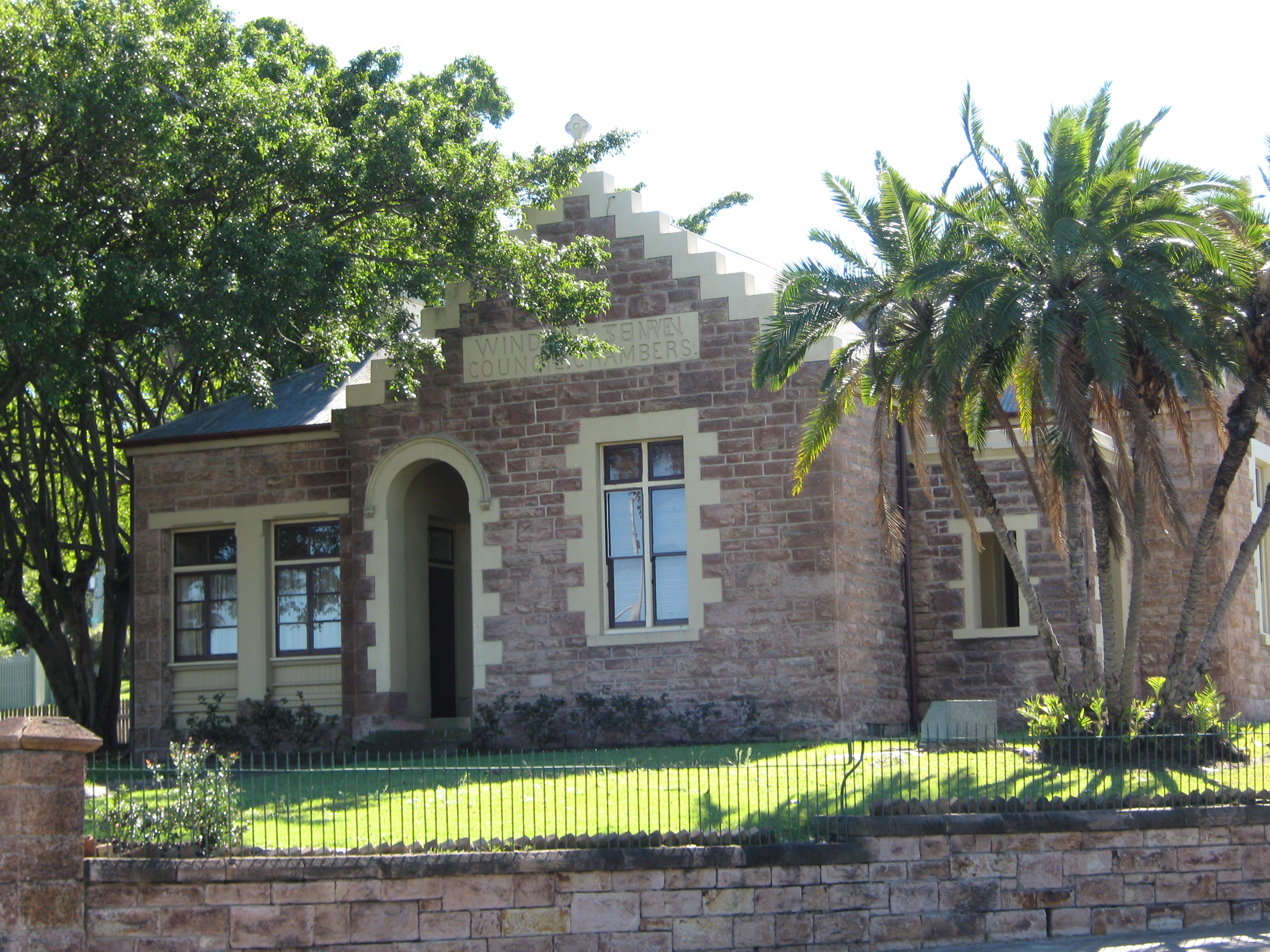
- Windsor Shire/Town Council Chambers, 2008

- Location within Queensland Location within Australia
- 27.4293°S 153.0322°E
- Location: 356 Lutwyche Road, Windsor, City of Brisbane, Queensland, Australia

History
- Design period: 1870s–1890s (late 19th century)
- Built: 1896–1897

Site notes
- Architect: Thomas Coutts

Queensland Heritage Register
- Official name: Windsor Shire Council Chambers (former), Windsor Town Council Chambers
- Type: state heritage (built)
- Designated: 21 October 1992
- Reference no.: 600349
- Significant period: 1890s (fabric); 1890s–1920s (historical)
- Significant components: trees/plantings, office/s, fence/wall – perimeter, council chamber/meeting room, strong room, gate – entrance
- Builders: William Parsons

Windsor Shire Council Chambers is a heritage-listed former town hall at 356 Lutwyche Road, Windsor, City of Brisbane, Queensland, Australia. It was designed by architect Thomas Coutts and built from 1896 to 1897 by William Parsons. It is also known as Windsor Town Council Chambers. It was added to the Queensland Heritage Register on 21 October 1992.

== History ==
The former Windsor Shire Council Chambers was erected in 1896–97 for a cost of £736.

The Windsor Shire Council was formed in 1886 and initially rented space for chambers and offices. In July 1895 the Council decided to erect permanent chambers and engaged Thomas Coutts, a Brisbane-born architect who also worked in Sydney, Melbourne and Newcastle during the 1890s, to design a modest building. In October 1896 a contract for £584 was signed with builder William Parsons. A separate contract for £80 was let for the boundary wall, which was completed in December 1897.

The first meeting of the Windsor Council in the new premises was conducted on 9 March 1897. The building housed the offices and chambers of the Windsor Shire Council (Windsor Town Council from 1904) until the amalgamation of Greater Brisbane in 1925, when it became the property of the Brisbane City Council.

The Brisbane City Council used the building for regional office space and storage. Alterations undertaken by the Council included: widening of the southern window in the office adjoining the front porch to create a doorway; concreting of strong room and toilet floors; relining of ceilings; sealing of fireplaces; and cutting a new door in the corridor.

In 1987 the exterior stonework was redressed as part of a restoration project by the Brisbane City Council. Also the original interior colour scheme was identified, and the grounds were returfed and paved to resemble a typical Brisbane turn of the century garden design.

The premises were vacated by the Council in late 1990, and are now used by the Brisbane Branch of National Trust of Queensland and the Windsor and District Historical Society for offices and meeting rooms.

== Description ==
The Windsor Shire Council Chambers is a small masonry building constructed of locally quarried porphyry (Brisbane tuff), with dressed sandstone facings and trimmings. It is capped with a corrugated iron gabled roof.

The building is domestic in scale and concept, yet its original civic function is expressed in decorative elements such as an arched entrance with drip moulding, quoining to the rectangular windows, and stepped sandstone courses at the gables. A sandstone slab on the front gable bears the inscription "Windsor Shire Council Chambers", with the word "Shire" overwritten by "Town".

The entrance verandah, which has been enclosed with glazing, leads a to central corridor, with two offices to the left and a front office and council meeting room to the right. These are connected by a small attached porch on the eastern side of the building. At the rear an attached stone wing houses a strong room and toilets. Flooring was timber originally, but some floors are now concreted. The interior walls and partitions are plastered and painted.

Located on an island of land, bounded by Lutwyche Road, Hawkins and Palmer Streets, the Windsor Shire Council Chambers occupies a highly visible position, and together with the Windsor War Memorial Park opposite is particularly prominent from the southern approach along Lutwyche Road.

The site is fenced on three sides with a stone wall and iron pickets, the entrance defined by substantial stone gateposts, cast-iron gates, and a thin metal arch from which an ornate gas lantern once hung. A number of mature fig trees and palms enhance the building's setting.

== Heritage listing ==
Windsor Shire Council Chambers (former) was listed on the Queensland Heritage Register on 21 October 1992 having satisfied the following criteria.

The place is important in demonstrating the evolution or pattern of Queensland's history.

Windsor Shire Council Chambers is important for its association with the Windsor Shire and the development of the Windsor district.

The place is important in demonstrating the principal characteristics of a particular class of cultural places.

Windsor Shire Council Chambers is significant as a fine and unusual example of a small scale masonry civic building.

Windsor Shire Council Chambers is significant as an example of the work of architect Thomas Coutts.

The place is important because of its aesthetic significance.

Windsor Shire Council Chambers is significant for its landmark quality, townscape contribution of both building and site to the Windsor area.
