= Music of Brisbane =

Brisbane is a city in Queensland, Australia, home to many regionally important music institutions and venues, including Big Sound music industry conference. For information about both classical and popular music in Brisbane, please see the following articles:

- Arts and culture in Brisbane, which includes information about classical music and opera singers, and jazz singers in Brisbane, and information about performing arts venues and Brisbane theatres.
- Popular entertainment in Brisbane, which includes information about Pop, rock, heavy metal and punk music in Brisbane, and about nightclubs in both Brisbane and Fortitude Valley
- Brisbane punk rock, has information on Brisbane's seminal punk history from 1975 to 1984.

The Queensland Conservatorium Griffith University was established in 1957 as the Conservatorium of Music.

== See also ==
- Music of Australia
