= Henry Wallace Atkinson =

Australian architect

Henry Wallace Atkinson (22 April 1866 – 26 April 1938) was an architect in Brisbane, Queensland, Australia. Many of his works are now heritage-listed.

== Early life ==
Henry Wallace Atkinson was born on 22 April 1866 in Brisbane, the son of Paul Cole Atkinson from Cork, Ireland and his wife Jane (née Creech). Having finished school, he was one of the first intake of students into the Brisbane Technical College in 1883.

He was a keen athlete and was Queensland champion cyclist in 1887.

He married Martha Jane Hipwood, daughter of James Hipwood (Mayor of Brisbane) on 30 April 1891 at St Philip's Church of England at Thompson Estate (now Annerley).

== Career ==
He was articled to architect Christian Waagepetersen and then worked as a draughtsman in the office of the Queensland Colonial Architect from 1882 to 1890. In 1889, he submitted an entry into a competition for a new Head Fire Station on the corner of Ann and Edward Streets in Brisbane. Having won the competition, he left the Queensland Public Service and started his own private practice. The Head Fire Station was completed in December 1890 but has since been demolished. However, his architectural practice has continued through a series of partnerships.

In 1907, he took Charles McLay as his partner creating Atkinson and McLay. That partnership lasted until 1918, when McLay died. Atkinson then partnered with Arnold Henry Conrad (who had joined the firm in 1912) to create Atkinson and Conrad which lasted from 1918 until 1939.

== Later life ==
Henry Wallace Atkinson died at his home in Cavendish Road, Coorparoo, Brisbane on 26 April 1938. He had been in poor health for more than a year prior to his death and had to reduce his architectural work.

== Legacy ==
In 2015, the practice founded by Henry Atkinson is known as Conrad Gargett and celebrated its 125-year anniversary.

The University of Queensland Library holds many architectural drawings by Atkinson and his practice.

== Works ==
His works include:

Atkinson

- Coorparoo School of Arts and RSL Memorial Hall (1892)

Atkinson and Conrad

- former Balmoral Fire Station (1926)
- Brisbane Boys College (1930)
- former Coorparoo Fire Station (1935)

Atkinson and McLay

- Ithaca Town Council Chambers (1910)
- Taabinga Homestead (garage, store and meat house, 1909)
