= Coorparoo Fire Station =

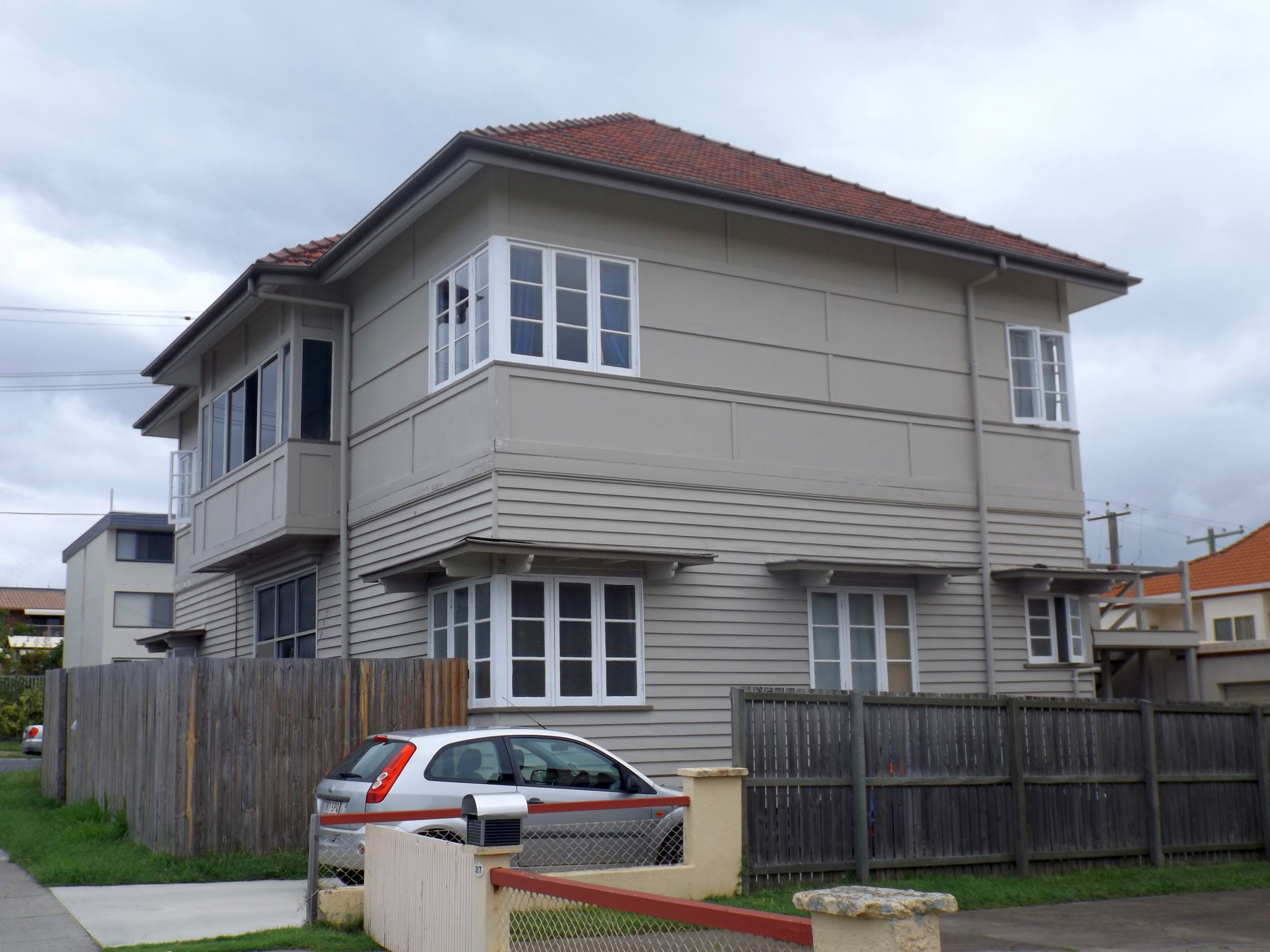
- The building as a residence, 2015

- Location within Queensland Location within Australia
- 27.4966°S 153.0602°E
- Location: 219 Cavendish Road, Coorparoo, City of Brisbane, Queensland, Australia

History
- Design period: 1919–1930s (interwar period)
- Built: 1935

Site notes
- Architect: Atkinson & Conrad
- Architectural style: Georgian

Queensland Heritage Register
- Official name: Coorparoo Fire Station (former)
- Type: state heritage (built)
- Designated: 11 June 2003
- Reference no.: 600569
- Significant period: 1930s (historical); 1930s (fabric); 1935–76 (social)
- Significant components: fire station, residential accommodation – superintendent's house/quarters

Coorparoo Fire Station is a heritage-listed former fire station at 219 Cavendish Road, Coorparoo, City of Brisbane, Queensland, Australia. It was designed by Atkinson & Conrad and built in 1935. It was added to the Queensland Heritage Register on 11 June 2003.

== History ==
From about 1931, local progression associations led by C. Beak and W. J. Smout began to lobby to have a fire station established in their area. However, the fire board did not have the funds to establish a new station until March 1935 when they borrowed £22,000 from the Commonwealth Bank.

The fire station was opened on Thursday 26 September 1935 by John Innes Brown, Member of the Queensland Legislative Assembly for Logan. The Dennis turbine fire engine at the station was the most modern available. The station served the Coorparoo, Camp Hill and Holland Park areas.

Prior to 2003, the fire station was decommissioned, similar to many other of the older fire stations which were too small to handle the larger fire engines.

== Heritage listing ==
The former Coorparoo Fire Station was listed on the Queensland Heritage Register on 11 June 2003 having satisfied the following criteria.

The place is important in demonstrating the evolution or pattern of Queensland's history.

The former Coorparoo Fire Station is an important example of the upgrading of fire stations undertaken in Brisbane suburbs by the Queensland Government through the Metropolitan Fire Board during the 1930s. The building was in continuous use as a fire station from 1935 to 1976 and is important as the first of and model for the group of fire stations designed and constructed during this upgrade.

The place is important in demonstrating the principal characteristics of a particular class of cultural places.

The former Coorparoo Fire Station is an important example of the architecture and planning of Brisbane suburban fire stations of the 1930s incorporating offices and engine room to the ground floor and a residence to the first floor. The interiors in both the operational and domestic areas reflect the operation of 1930s fire stations and are substantially intact.

The place is important because of its aesthetic significance.

The former Coorparoo Fire Station has aesthetic and architectural significance as a former modest, functional civic building. Robust and austere, with its simple horizontal banding and use of readily available materials, it is easily identified in the streetscape. A landmark on Cavendish Road, the former fire station is sympathetic in scale, form and materials to its residential setting.

The place has a special association with the life or work of a particular person, group or organisation of importance in Queensland's history.

The former Coorparoo Fire Station is a fine example of the work of the architectural firm Atkinson and Conrad. Atkinson, through the firms he was associated with, sustained a long association with the Fire Services in Brisbane commencing in 1890 with his design for the new headquarters for the Brisbane Fire Brigade. His architectural practices were responsible for many of the fire stations throughout Brisbane. It is a proto-Modern building and elements evident in the design may have been influential in popularising their use.
