= Rosalie RSL Hall =

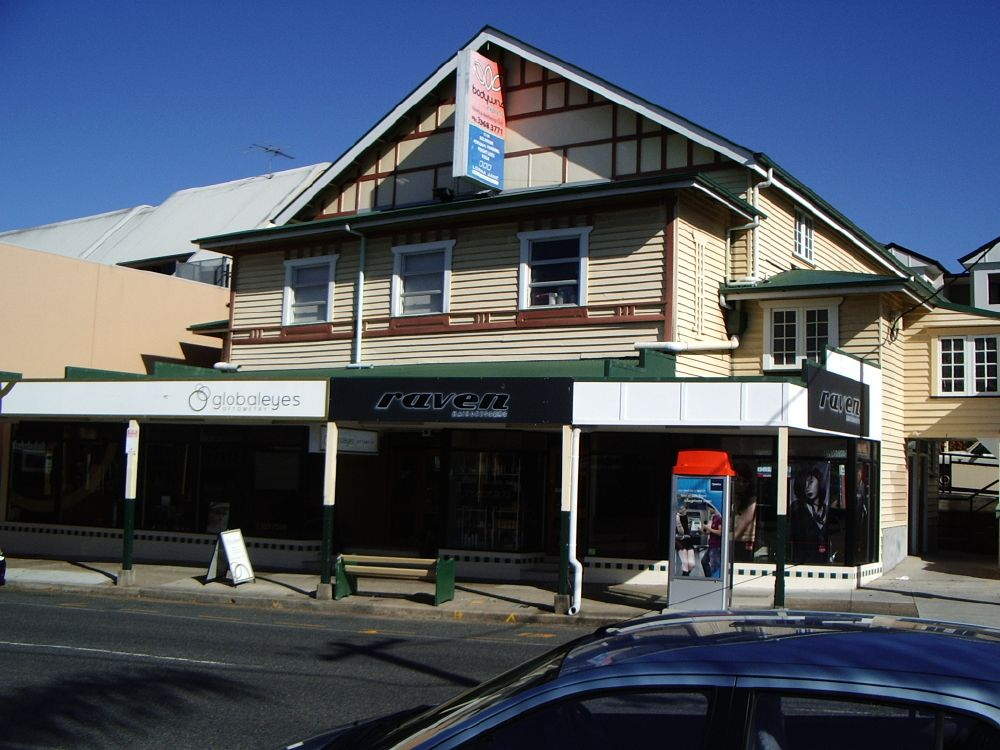
- Rosalie RSL Hall, 2006

- Location within Queensland Location within Australia
- 27.4654°S 152.9967°E
- Location: 50 Elizabeth Street, Paddington, City of Brisbane, Queensland, Australia

History
- Design period: 1919–1930s (interwar period)
- Built: 1927–1928

Site notes
- Architect: Hall & Prentice

Queensland Heritage Register
- Official name: RSL Hall Rosalie, Rosalie School of Arts Commemoration Hall
- Type: state heritage (built)
- Designated: 6 September 2005
- Reference no.: 602517
- Significant period: 1927–1928 (fabric); 1934, 1938, 1942–1957, 1974 (historical); 1928–ongoing (social)
- Significant components: stage/sound shell, projection booth/bio box, memorial – honour board/ roll of honour, shop/s
- Builders: W Moody

Rosalie RSL Hall is a heritage-listed school of arts located at 50 Elizabeth Street, Paddington (formerly Rosalie), City of Brisbane, Queensland, Australia. It was designed by Hall & Prentice and built from 1927 to 1928 by W Moody. It is also known as Rosalie School of Arts Commemoration Hall. It was added to the Queensland Heritage Register on 6 September 2005.

== History ==
The RSL Hall at Rosalie, formerly the Rosalie School of Arts Commemoration Hall, is a large timber building roofed in corrugated iron. It faces Nash Street in Rosalie, a locality that is now part of the suburb of Paddington. Since opening in 1928 the RSL Hall has hosted a wide variety of community activities. The ground floor of the Nash Street frontage, below the level of the main hall, was designed to accommodate two shops.

The first major land sales in the Paddington area occurred in 1859, when country lots were sold for £2/10/- an acre. The steep terrain hampered transport, and people sought ridge-top sites, timber cutting sites, or cultivated vegetable patches on the lower ground closer to the river. The first tracks followed the ridgelines, and it was along these narrow corridors that closer development initially occurred. In the late 1870s, Paddington was known as "Ti Tree Flats", and its postal address was simply "back of the gaol", being outside the Hale Street boundary of the city. There was a village at Caxton Street, and some houses on Given Terrace. Further out, the scenery was dotted with trees, vegetable patches, goats, tents, humpies, cottages, and the odd, elegant mansion. Johann Christian Heussler built the stately home Fernberg in 1865, and in 1920 the Queensland Government purchased it as a residence for the Governor. During the 1880s a pattern developed whereby shops were clustered near major intersections, the affluent occupied the highest ground, aspiring artisans occupied the slopes, and poorer citizens built in the gullies. The Ithaca Shire was created in 1887, and by 1903 Paddington was a densely populated suburb of the town of Ithaca. The tramway reached Latrobe Terrace in 1898, and Fernberg Road 1909, which spurred development.

Rosalie is a small locality within Paddington, covering about 1,000 by 800 metres (3,300 by 2,600 ft), on ground that slopes down towards Gregory Park. It is named after the station of a Darling Downs grazier, John Frederick McDougall, who in 1882 purchased portion 225 of the Parish of Enoggera. This portion contained the future site of the Rosalie RSL Hall. The 1920s saw increased development in Rosalie, and the Rosalie Progress Association sponsored a Rosalie School of Arts Committee, for the purpose of erecting a Memorial Hall.

The first mechanics' institutes or Schools of Arts were established in Britain in the early 1800s and were intended to assist self-improvement and to promote moral, social and intellectual growth, by providing lectures, discussions and lending libraries to a rising middle class. At the time there were no public libraries and books were expensive, so that access to books by borrowing as subscribers provided an important educational and recreational service. The first School of Arts committee in Queensland was established in Brisbane in 1849 with the aim of "the advancement of the community in literary, philosophic and scientific subjects". As towns and districts became established, local committees were formed to establish schools of arts, and they became one of the principal sources of adult education. The buildings usually included a public hall for debates and performances, a subscription library, and a reading room. The erecting of a School of Arts in a particular community was seen as a sign that that community had "come of age".

However, the Rosalie School of Arts would also serve as a war memorial. The outpouring of grief in Australia that accompanied the deaths of 60,000 servicepeople in World War I, and the fact that the dead were buried overseas, led to a period of memorial construction across the nation. The Toowong Town Council offered the Rosalie School of Arts Committee a site in Gregory Park, next to the Milton State School, for the Rosalie School of Arts Memorial Hall. Instead, the School of Arts Committee held a fete in March 1926, raising the money to buy the current site at the corner of Elizabeth Street and Nash Street. The builder W. Moody designed the hall in 1926, but the Architectural Firm Hall and Prentice, which also designed the Brisbane City Hall and the Tattersalls Club, refined Moody's plan. At the stump-capping ceremony of 9 July 1927, official guests included the Governor, Sir John Goodwin; Brisbane's Mayor William Jolly; Colonel Donald Charles Cameron, Member of House of Representatives for Brisbane, and a decorated veteran of the Boer War and World War I; and Ned Hanlon, Member of the Legislative Assembly for Ithaca. Hanlon noted that the site was preferable to Gregory Park. The latter is labelled as "Red Jacket Swamp" on an 1895 map of the area.

Built by Moody, the hall cost £2,650, plus £550 for the library and furnishings, with a mortgage of £1,500 to the Public Curator. Funds to pay off the debt were raised by selling three-year membership subscriptions, and Life Memberships at five guineas. More funds were raised by including two shops on the ground floor frontage of the hall, numbered at 16 and 18 Nash Street. The Rosalie School of Arts Commemoration Hall was officially opened on 28 June 1928 by Mayor Jolly. The purpose of the hall was to bring residents together on social basis, while the library and reading room would help in their education. In mid 1928 work was also started on the Marist Brothers College Rosalie monastery and school, and the Rainworth State School was opened.

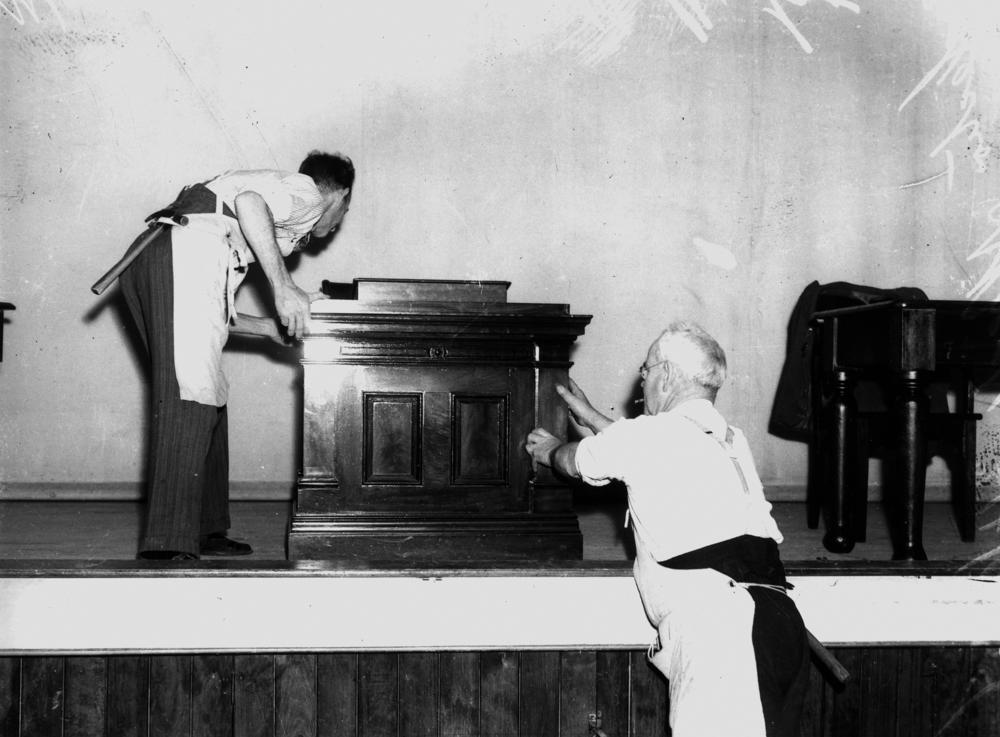
Workmen preparing the Rosalie School of Arts for an Elections Tribunal, 1938

The RSL Hall has accommodated a wide range of community activities over the years. The Rosalie Kindergarten operated from the hall between 1929 and 1935, and the Ithaca Sub-Branch of the Returned Sailors' Soldiers' and Airmen's Imperial League of Australia (RSSAILA, later known as the Returned and Services League of Australia, or RSL) was founded in the hall in November 1934. In 1938 an Elections Tribunal was held in the hall, during an appeal against the election of Ned Hanlon, then Minister for Home Affairs. It was home to the Ithaca Youth Club between 1945 and 1950, and also hosted a Buffalo Lodge for many years. Other community activities have included public meetings, concerts, exhibitions, fancy dress balls, ANZAC Day commemorations, martial arts classes, and indoor bowls. In 1946, the library collection was sent to the Brisbane City Council library in the former Ithaca Town Council Chambers. That same year Queensland Premier Ned Hanlon introduced a bill that was passed as the Rosalie School of Arts and Commemoration Hall Transfer Act 1946, which transferred the property to the Ithaca sub-branch of the RSL. In 1991 an amalgamation of sub-branches formed the Ithaca-South Brisbane RSL BCOF sub-branch.

Between 1942 and 1957, on Tuesday, Friday, and Saturday nights the hall became the 300-seat Beverley Theatre, with a commercial photographer showing films. Other theatres in the area included the Plaza Theatre, Latrobe Terrace (1930–1960) and the Paddington Theatre, Caxton Street (1923–1979). In 2003 and 2004, the Cine-Retro Film Society, which showed pre-1960 movies in a suitable atmosphere, briefly revived this former use.

The shops below the hall have also had various tenants. Number 16 Nash Street contained a dressmaker in 1930, Trump Cycles from 1938 to 1942, and a sub-centre of the Maternal and Child Welfare Service from 1942, which was still open one day a week in 1978. An optometrist now occupies 16 Nash Street. Number 18 Nash Street contained a bootmaker's business between 1935 and 1947, and now contains a hair salon. The RSL sold the property in 2004, and now leases the hall for its monthly meetings and commemorative events. The hall itself currently contains a fitness centre. There is also a computer business on the ground floor directly under the hall, accessed from the carpark on the north side. A software company occupies the small house at 52 Elizabeth Street, which sits just to the north of the hall. This house is included in a 1935 map of the site.

The hall experienced some damage during the 1974 Brisbane floods.

Some changes to the property over the years include the addition of a glass-roofed entry, and a timber passageway linking it to the original northern wing of the hall; an awning on the north side has been removed recently; the RSL renovated the interior of the hall, and the shops have been refurbished. On the northern side of the hall, one of the doorway landings has been fully enclosed, with the outside stairs being removed. The shop awning has also been simplified, losing its original mouldings and detailing. Five rotating galvanised iron vents were added sometime after 1938, projecting from either side of the ridge of the roof, and these were replaced with new vents recently. The first-floor rooms above the shops now have three triple-hung sash windows, instead of the original small pane casement windows, which can be seen around the rest of the hall. A sign also projects from the middle of the front gable, which was originally decorated with the words 1928 Rosalie School of Arts Commemoration Hall.

== Description ==
The RSL Hall in Rosalie straddles the southern half of three allotments which total 1131 square metres in area. To the north of the hall is a software business in a small timber house, which is clad with chamfer boards, and a carpark, accessed from Elizabeth Street. The hall faces Nash Street, is clad in weatherboards, and has a corrugated iron roof. The first floor contains the hall, while the ground floor contains three shops: two facing Nash Street, and one directly under the hall, entered from the northern carpark.

The gable fronting Nash Street is decorated with cover strips, forming a simple geometric pattern. Below this design, and above the shops, is a stepped projection that currently contains two changing rooms and a kitchen. The two Nash Street shops extend to the east of the hall on the ground floor, and their frontage is angled to conform to the angle of the road reserve. Two small stepped wings extend north and south of the hall, and stairs descend into them from the first floor of the hall. The first floor of the southern wing contains showers, while the first floor of the northern wing contains storage rooms, and has been incorporated into the entrance stairway that rises from the glass entry foyer. The ground floor of the northern wing also contains toilets, which are accessed from the tunnel that runs underneath the entrance stairway.

The main hall of the building has a stage at the western end, and on either side of the stage are stairs up to small side rooms. Stairs also descend from the stage towards toilets to either side. At the eastern end of the hall, large curtains conceal the RSL's memorabilia, which is revealed during RSL meetings. Behind the curtains, in the upper part of the eastern wall, is the open window of the projection room. The projection room is in poor condition, and access to it has been sealed. There is a small office, with open serving bays, between the two doorways at the eastern end of the hall. Near the office, at the top of the entrance stairway, is a large Ithaca Honour Board, listing those who served in World War I.

The carpark, the new entrance foyer and stairway, and the small house just north of the hall, are not of historical significance.

== Heritage listing ==
The Rosalie RSL Hall was listed on the Queensland Heritage Register on 6 September 2005 having satisfied the following criteria.

The place is important in demonstrating the evolution or pattern of Queensland's history.

The former School of Arts Memorial Hall in Rosalie demonstrates the system of adult education that functioned in Queensland during the nineteenth and early twentieth centuries. It is also illustrates the practice of constructing memorials to those Queenslanders who fell in World War I.

The place is important in demonstrating the principal characteristics of a particular class of cultural places.

The RSL Hall is an excellent example of a multi-purpose World War I memorial hall. It has been used as a venue for commemoration, education, entertainment, politics, sport, and socializing, and remains remarkably intact.

The place is important because of its aesthetic significance.

The large timber building, on its corner site, has possessed a landmark quality since its construction. Its size and multi-level stepped design makes a major contribution to the character of Rosalie's streetscape.

The place has a strong or special association with a particular community or cultural group for social, cultural or spiritual reasons.

The RSL Hall, through its decades of community service, has a longstanding and ongoing social and cultural association with the local community, and the Returned Services League.

The place has a special association with the life or work of a particular person, group or organisation of importance in Queensland's history.

The building is associated with the notable architectural firm of Hall and Prentice, which also designed the City Hall.
