= Poutasi (disambiguation) =

Poutasi may refer to:

== People ==
- Jeremiah Poutasi (born 1994) American football player
- Karen Poutasi (1949–2026), New Zealand government official
- Poutasi Luafutu (born 1987) Australian rugby union player

== Places ==
- Poutasi, village in Samoa
