= Hazel Harrison (teacher) =

Australian kindergarten principal (1905–1970)

- Born: 22 June 1905; Beaudesert, Queensland
- Died: 29 May 1970 (aged 64); Beaudesert, Queensland
- Education: Brisbane Kindergarten Teachers College
- Employer: Brisbane Kindergarten Teachers College
- Known for: refreshing kindergarten teacher's education

Hazel Joyce Harrison (22 June 1905 – 29 May 1970) was an Australian expert on child development. She was the college principal associated with the Brisbane Kindergarten Teachers College.

== Life ==
Harrison was born in 1905 in Beaudesert, Queensland. She completed her schooling in 1922 after six years of boarding at Brisbane High School for Girls. She had been good at sports particularly tennis. She then began her long association with the Brisbane Kindergarten Teachers College where she completed her studies in 1925.

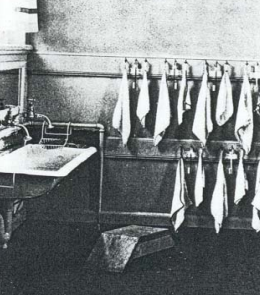
Model Pre-School Bathroom, 1939 by Hazel Harrison

In 1926 she became the director of the Rosalie Community Kindergarten and Creche.

In 1939 she became a lecturer at the Kindergarten Teachers' Training College, North Adelaide and she became its transformative director in 1940. The ideas of Montessori education were put to one side and replaced with new, mainly American, approaches to pre-school education. She published Model Pre-school Bathroom in 1939 where she gave examples of a bathroom to encourage a child's independence. The bathroom had individual towels labelled with each child's name.

In 1953 she was in London studying child development at the Institute of Education, University of London. She then moved to the Tavistock Clinic where she was teacher-in-charge from 1954. She and the child development expert John Bowlby looked critically at existing pre-school education. She left in 1956.

In 1967 she became the principal of the Brisbane Kindergarten Teachers College where she had trained. She and Dr Rupert P. Goodman created a new curriculum which encouraged students to support children through every stage of their environment.

== Death and legacy ==
Harrison died in May 1970 in a hospital in her hometown. She was said to have left "a vacuum" behind her that took some years to fill. Her students bought and donated a painting of her by Robert Dickerson to the college.
