= Rosalie Community Kindergarten and Preschool =

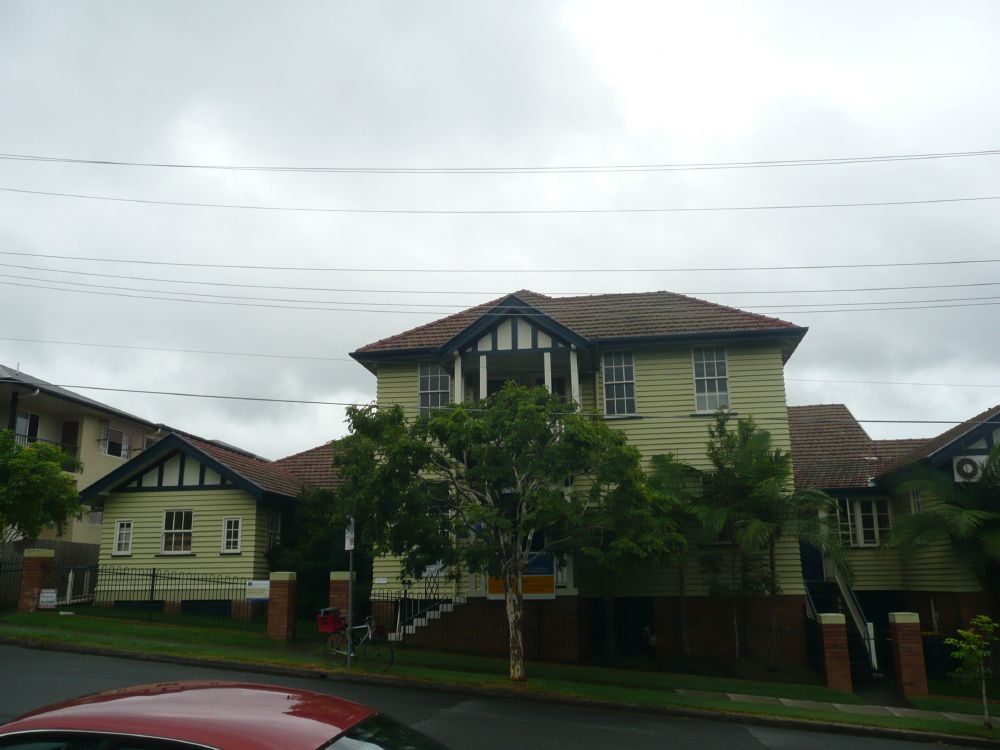
- Rosalie Community Kindergarten and Preschool, 2009

- Location within Queensland Location within Australia
- 27.4648°S 152.9964°E
- Location: 57 Elizabeth Street, Paddington, Queensland, Australia

History
- Design period: 1919–1930s (interwar period)
- Built: 1935

Site notes
- Architect: Arnold Edward Brooks
- Architectural style: Georgian

Queensland Heritage Register
- Official name: Rosalie Community Kindergarten and Preschool, Rosalie Kindergarten, The Little Citizens Free Kindergarten
- Type: state heritage (built, landscape)
- Designated: 27 September 2002
- Reference no.: 602380
- Significant period: 1930s (historical); 1930s (fabric); 1935–ongoing (social)
- Significant components: kindergarten, playground
- Builders: Ralph Alexander Lind

Rosalie Community Kindergarten and Preschool is a heritage-listed kindergarten at 57 Elizabeth Street, Paddington (formerly Rosalie), City of Brisbane, Queensland, Australia. It was designed by Arnold Edward Brooks and built in 1935 by Ralph Alexander Lind. It is also known as Rosalie Kindergarten and The Little Citizens Free Kindergarten. It was added to the Queensland Heritage Register on 27 September 2002.

== History ==
The Rosalie Community Kindergarten and Preschool is a two-storey timber building that was built in 1935 for the Crèche and Kindergarten Association to the design of Arnold Edward Brooks.

The development of kindergartens was an outcome of a movement that developed in the Western world in the late 19th century in response to new knowledge about the role of diet, hygiene and exercise in the health of children. The Infant Welfare movement in Australia began around 1904 and aimed both to improve the health of children and to educate their mothers.

In the early 20th century, approaches to running a household and bringing up children became more "scientific" and this was reflected in the design of buildings, domestic science classes in schools and specialized training for early childhood teachers. The new direction in rearing children was towards active play and planned nutrition within a light, clean and airy environment, a very different approach to the structures of a Victorian-era childhood.

The Crèche and Kindergarten Association of Queensland was formed in 1907 as a function of the Institute of Social Services in Fortitude Valley. A second branch was established in January 1911 and was called the Ithaca Crèche and Kindergarten. They cared for babies and children up to five years of age in two cottages at Herbert Street, Rosalie (now Paddington). The earliest childcare building in Brisbane, probably in Queensland, was Paddington Kindergarten, which was built in Charlotte Street in 1916 and included a crèche from 1917. The Ithaca crèche then closed, but the kindergarten remained in operation after lobbying by parents.

In 1922 the Maternity Act provided for the establishment of maternity hospitals and baby clinics in Queensland to improve the health of mothers and children. This was a Labor government initiative as fostering a healthy population and boosting the birthrate was thought to be essential to the development of the state. Funds from the proceeds of the Golden Casket Lottery were used to implement this. The Golden Casket lottery was introduced in 1916, initially to assist the Australian Soldiers' Repatriation Fund and Anzac Cottages Scheme. In 1920, the operation of the lottery was taken over by the Queensland Government and the main recipient of proceeds became the Motherhood, Child Welfare and Hospital Fund.

Hazel Joyce Harrison became the director of the Rosalie Crèche and Kindergarten in 1926. The Crèche and Kindergarten Association had leased various premises in the 1920s and in 1933; a Mother's Club was formed to raise funds for a permanent building. By 1934 they had raised £150. They also ran a street carnival at Roma Street for two months, which raised £791/18/4. The association approached Ned Hanlon, the Home Secretary and husband of the Rosalie committee chairwoman, who promised assistance. This took the form of a government subsidy for the construction of a new kindergarten on a pound for pound basis from Golden Casket funds.

The Home Department also provided £600 to buy land. In 1935, this site on the corner of Elizabeth and Nash Streets was purchased for the construction of a kindergarten. Even with the subsidy, the amount collected fell short of the cost and a government loan of £946/8/5 was provided to bridge the gap.

Arnold Brooks, architect for the Canberra Hotel and for various social welfare facilities, designed the new building. Brooks had worked in the offices of a number of distinguished architectural firms. Between 1888 and 1892 he was articled to Oakden, Addison and Kemp, remaining with their office as an assistant until 1901, when he joined the Telegraph newspaper. In 1908 he became an assistant to architect James Percy Owen Cowlishaw and then chief assistant at the architectural firm of Hall and Dods, acting as manager when Robin Dods moved to Sydney in 1913. Brooks was a correspondent on architectural matters for various journals and served on planning and Ideal Home committees. He was appointed architect to Brisbane Grammar School in 1921 and in 1922 established his own practice. In 1929 he designed what was his best-known building (now demolished), the Canberra Hotel. In 1929 he also became associate architect for the Queensland Crèche and Kindergarten Association. In 1935 he assumed the same role for the Queensland Society for Crippled Children.

On 1 April 1935, R A Lind & Sons of Manly began building the kindergarten at a cost of £3791. The Hon. Ned Hanlon, Minister for Health and Home Affairs, opened the new facility on 23 November 1935 as 'The Little Citizen's Free Kindergarten'. At the time it was considered to be the best-designed kindergarten in the Commonwealth. A number of features were thought innovative including a caretaker's residence on the upper floor; separate play areas for toddlers and older children, an undercover play area and large teaching areas divided by folding doors.

Rosalie Kindergarten was involved in the practical training of early childhood teachers since the inception of the Brisbane Kindergarten Training College in 1911. In 1940, it was one of two branch kindergartens that undertook a trial of the Nursery School program, teaching children between 2 and five years old. The Kindergarten Director, Edna Hill, went to Melbourne for a year's training in this program at the Melbourne Kindergarten Teacher's College.

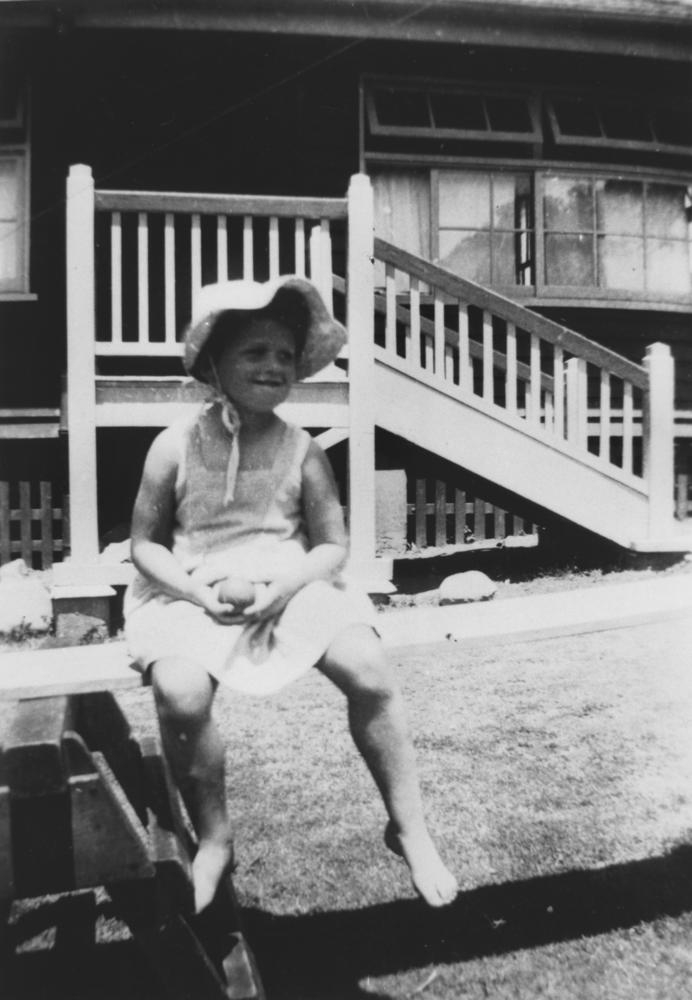
Girl at the Rosalie Kindergarten, circa 1945

Because it was originally a function of the Social Services Dept, the work of the kindergarten was aligned to the social needs of the area, caring for large groups of children for up to five days a week, providing hot meals mid-day and opening for hours that allowed mothers to work. During the Depression the hours were extended to allow mothers to maximize any available income. In 1942 although kindergartens in Brisbane were closed for a time they soon reopened as they made it possible for mothers to contribute to war work.

The Kindergarten is still operating as a childcare facility and the suitability of its design for this purpose is demonstrated by the very minor nature of modifications made to the fabric since its inception.

== Description ==
The Rosalie Community Kindergarten and Preschool is situated on a triangular site with elevations to Elizabeth and Nash Streets, Rosalie. It is constructed of hardwood weatherboards slightly bellcast over the supporting brick piers and has a central two-storey section flanked by single storey pavilions.

The terracotta tiled roof is complex in form and the most striking feature of the main, Elizabeth Street elevation, is two storey porch forming an entrance on the ground floor and a small balcony above. Multiple-paned sash windows echo the Georgian influence displayed in the symmetrical pavilion form.

The building is divided into public, private and services zones. The upper storey of the central section is reached by a timber staircase and contains a flat, originally the caretaker's residence, complete with laundry and bathroom with original fittings. This floor is currently used for storage.

The ground floor contains the entry and service areas that are divided from the main teaching and play zones by a waiting area. The teaching area is large and airy and can be divided by folding doors. The toilet rooms are situated at each end of the building and contain early timber partitions and cabinets. A wide verandah flanks two sides of the playrooms and has timber balustrades with metal diamond mesh above. Stairs from the verandah lead down to a play area beneath the building.

The interior is lined with boards to dado height with fibrous cement sheeting above. The rooms are ceiled with fibrous cement sheeting and timber battens. The building contains some fine detailing including mitred corners and bellcast bases to the weatherboard walls and well-executed timber balustrading and details to the verandahs. Such details as fittings and door furniture are preserved and reflect the quality of design and construction in this building.

On the Nash Street side of the building is a playground with mature trees.

== Heritage listing ==
Rosalie Community Kindergarten and Preschool was listed on the Queensland Heritage Register on 27 September 2002 having satisfied the following criteria.

The place is important in demonstrating the evolution or pattern of Queensland's history.

The Rosalie Community Kindergarten and Preschool is important in illustrating the growth of the Infant Welfare movement and changing attitudes to health, education and child care in Queensland during the early 20th century. The size and quality of the building demonstrates the commitment of the Labor government of the period to initiatives promoting maternal and child welfare as part of the development of the state. The contemporary ideals of light, space and airiness for children's facilities are well expressed in the design of the building.

The place demonstrates rare, uncommon or endangered aspects of Queensland's cultural heritage.

The Rosalie Community Kindergarten and Preschool is rare in Queensland as a purpose built kindergarten built before World War II.

The place is important in demonstrating the principal characteristics of a particular class of cultural places.

It demonstrates the distinct function and design of a purpose built kindergarten of the era and was considered to be particularly well-designed example when it was built. The suitability of its design for this purpose is demonstrated by the minor nature of modifications made to the fabric since its inception, resulting in a high degree of intactness.

The place is important because of its aesthetic significance.

The kindergarten building has aesthetic significance as a well executed building in the Georgian revival style with references to the Queensland vernacular. It is a local landmark.

The place has a strong or special association with a particular community or cultural group for social, cultural or spiritual reasons.

The Rosalie Community Kindergarten and Preschool has an association with the local community over several generations as a community service providing education and recreation for children, training for early childhood teachers and assistance for mothers.

The place has a special association with the life or work of a particular person, group or organisation of importance in Queensland's history.

The Rosalie Community Kindergarten and Preschool is an important example of the work of architect Arnold E Brooks who was considered to be an innovative designer of child and aged care facilities.
