= Rosalie, Queensland =

Neighbourhood of Paddington, Brisbane

Rosalie
- Suburb
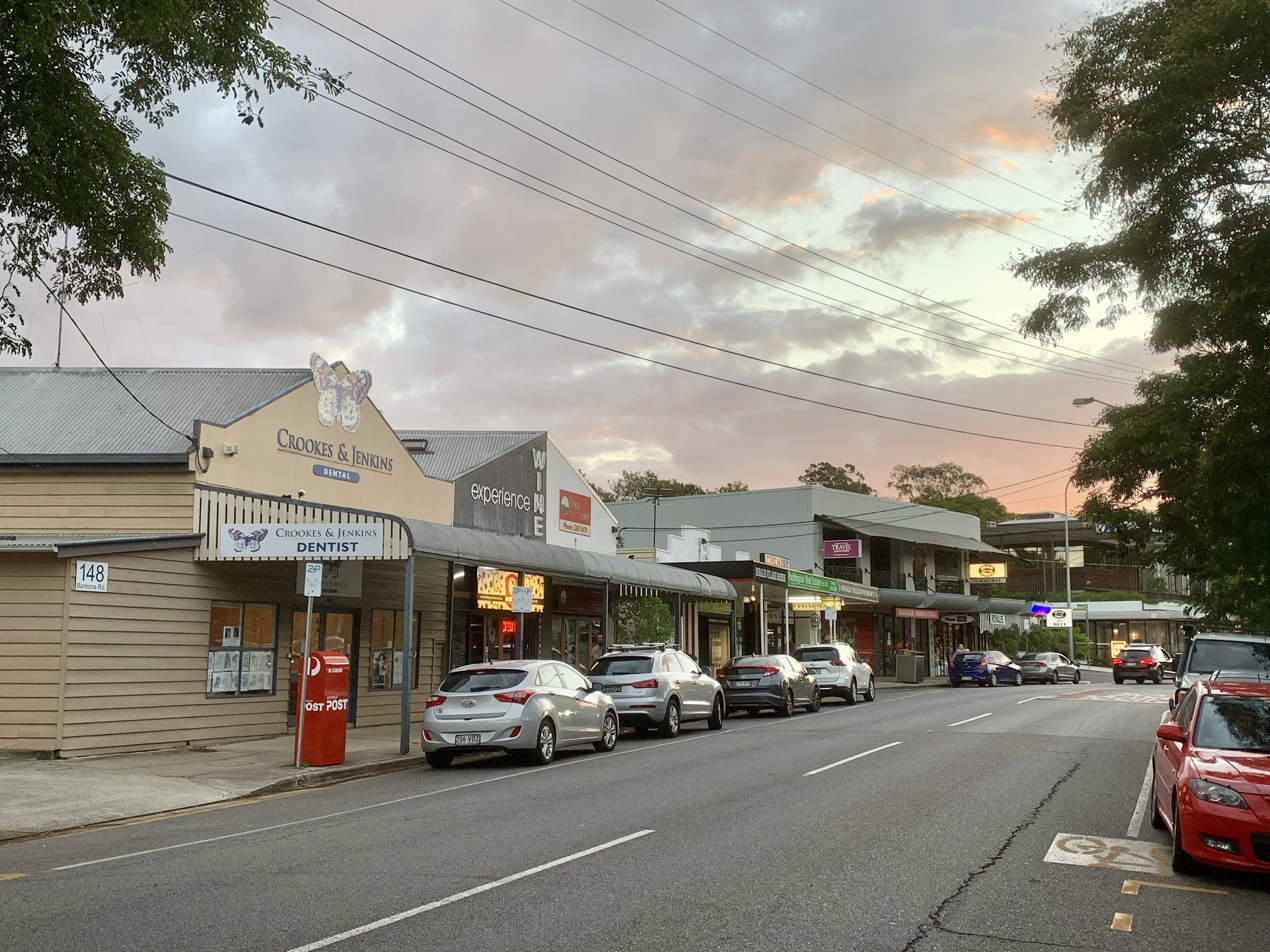
- Baroona Road, main street in Rosalie, 2019

- Coordinates: 27.4663°S 152.9969°E
- Country: Australia
- State: Queensland
- City: Brisbane
- LGA: City of Brisbane (Paddington Ward)
- Location: 4.4 km (2.7 mi) W of Brisbane CBD

Government
  - State electorates: Cooper; Maiwar
  - Federal divisions: Brisbane; Ryan
- Time zone: UTC+10:00 (AEST)
- Postcode: 4064

Rosalie is a former suburb of Brisbane, Queensland, Australia. Since 1975, it has been an official neighbourhood within the suburb of Paddington.

== History ==
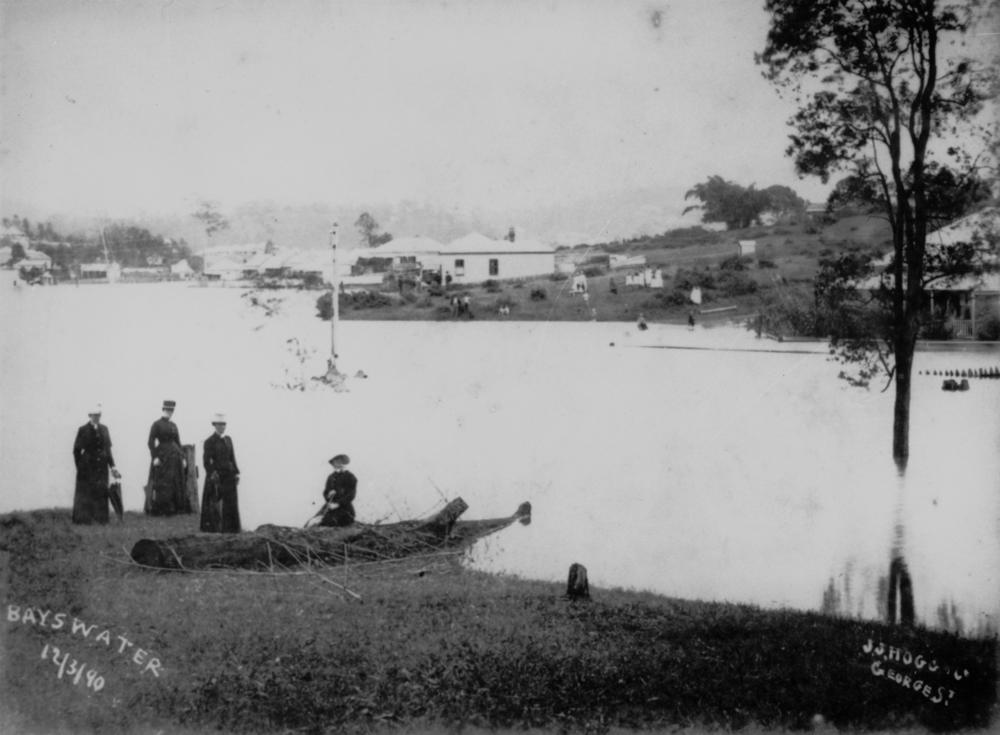
Floods along Bayswater Road, Rosalie, 1890

The name Rosalie is probably derived from the Rosalie Plains pastoral station leased by John Frederick McDougall, who also owned land in the Milton and Rosalie areas of Brisbane.

On Sunday 5 April 1884, a Baptist church opened in Rosalie, being described as a "neat little chapel" and was 20 by 20 feet (6.1 by 6.1 m). On Saturday 7 November 1925, a new Baptist church was opened.

Rosalie was subject to flooding in the 1890 Brisbane floods.

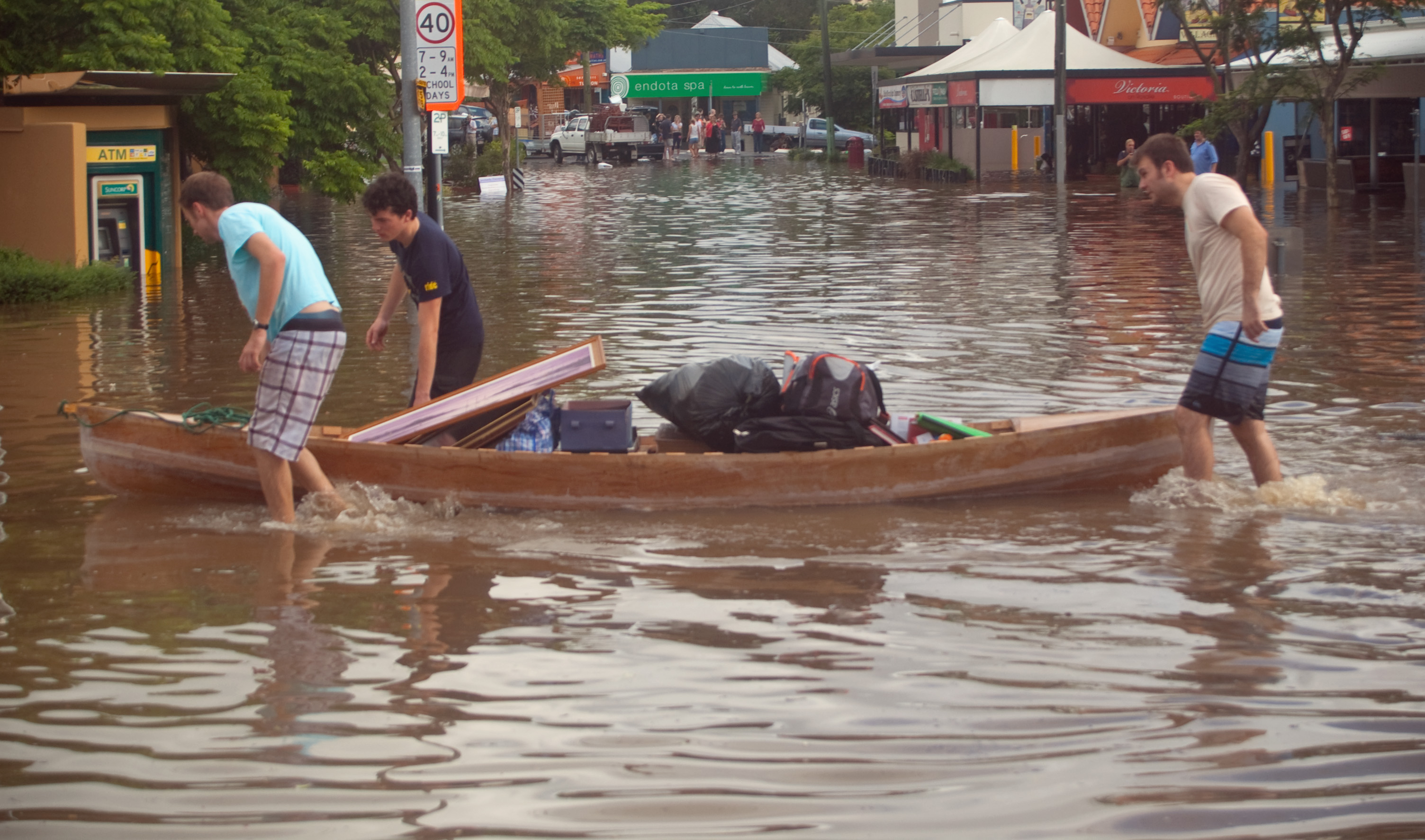
Evacuating from Rosalie, 2011

The lower parts of Rosalie were inundated in the 2011 Brisbane Floods.

== Amenities ==
The centre of Rosalie contains many local shops and restaurants. They are all located closely to the intersection of Baroona Road and Nash Street. They promote themselves collectively as Rosalie Village.

Nearby parks and playgrounds include Gregory Park and Frew Park.

Rosalie Baptist Church is at 97 Fernberg Road (27.4629°S 152.9965°E).

== Heritage listings ==
Rosalie has a number of heritage-listed sites, including:

- Rosalie RSL Hall, 50 Elizabeth Street
- Rosalie Community Kindergarten and Preschool, 57 Elizabeth Street
- Marist Brothers College Rosalie Buildings, Fernberg Road
