= Marist Brothers College Rosalie Buildings =

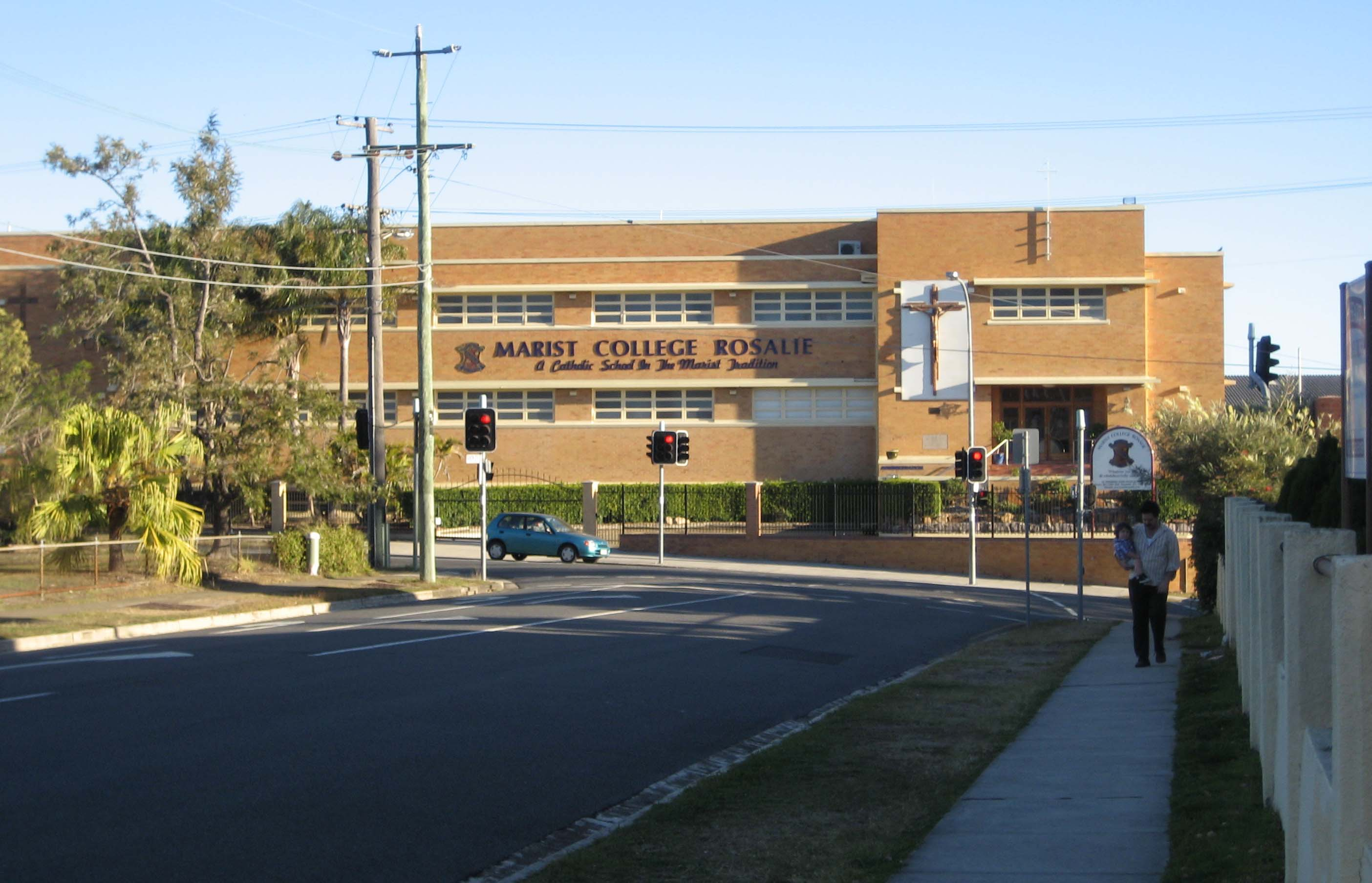
- Main college building, 2007

- Location within Queensland
- 27.4639°S 152.9994°E
- Location: Fernberg Road, Rosalie, City of Brisbane, Queensland, Australia

Queensland Heritage Register
- Official name: Marist Brothers' Monastery and Marist College
- Type: state heritage (built)
- Designated: 18 September 2008
- Reference no.: 602607
- Significant period: 1920s

Marist Brothers College Rosalie Buildings are heritage-listed Roman Catholic monastery and school buildings at Fernberg Road, Rosalie, City of Brisbane, Queensland, Australia. They are also known as Marist Brothers' Monastery and Marist College. They were added to the Queensland Heritage Register on 18 September 2008.

The school closed in November 2008 due to declining student numbers. However, the campus continues to be used by the Marist Brothers and the local Catholic parish.

== History ==
The Marist Brothers' College and Monastery at Fernberg Road, Rosalie was opened in 1929 as part of Roman Catholic Archbishop James Duhig's vision for the development of the Church in Queensland through the provision of affordable high quality Catholic education. It was the first Queensland school of the Marist Brothers' order and has continued to provide a religious education to generations of boys over an 80-year period. The school developed into a regional college with the erection in 1949 of the Sacred Heart Memorial College, which provided for families in five adjoining parishes and other areas of the city. The school drew mostly from its local population in the suburbs of Paddington, Milton, Bardon, Red Hill and Petrie Terrace which was made up mainly of Anglo-Irish Catholic Australians, indigenous aboriginal people and waves of Catholic immigrants firstly Irish, followed later by Italians, Croatians, Polish and other post-World War II immigrants. More recent enrolments at the school have included smaller groups of Islander, South American and South-East Asian families.

The first major land sales in the Paddington area occurred in 1859, when large country lots were sold. The steep terrain hampered transport and tracks followed the ridgeline, so that it was along these narrow corridors that development initially occurred. Ithaca Shire was created in 1887, and by 1903 Paddington was a densely populated suburb of the Town of Ithaca. The tramway reached Latrobe Terrace in 1898, and Fernberg Road in 1909, which spurred development.

In 1898 the first Roman Catholic Church in Paddington, the Church of the Holy Rosary, was built on an elevated site on the western side of Given Terrace near Fernberg Road. The early Catholic community was very small and the Sisters of Mercy travelled from the All Hallows' School at Fortitude Valley to teach catechism to the children. By 1907 the Roman Catholic community had grown considerably and a new timber church was built at the corner of Given Terrace and Fernberg Road next to the original church which was adapted for use as a school building. Continuing growth in the parish resulted in the construction of the presbytery on the opposite corner on Given Terrace in 1914, followed by the purchase of the Herbert Estate (the present Marist site) on Fernberg Road by Archbishop Duhig.

In 1918, the 1898 building from Given Terrace was moved onto the Herbert Estate for use by the Sisters of Mercy to teach the older girls and boys. The 1907 church was adapted for use as an infant school and a new brick masonry church designed by George Henry Male Addison was built next to it on the site of the original church. These works included the erection of brick walls along the street frontages of both properties giving them "an appearance of stability and permanence". The Sisters of Mercy, who had been travelling from All Hallows' by tram to teach the children built their convent further north on Given Terrace at the same time.

In the 1920s Rosalie was quickly developing as a "working men's parish", and its needs rapidly outstripped the services provided by existing schools. The Church was concerned with providing both secular and religious education and Duhig wanted to ensure that a high quality Catholic secondary education was available. The school population at Rosalie continued to grow and reached 300 students with 200 in the infant school, half of which were boys. With the Archbishop's approval it was decided to seek the assistance of the Marist Brothers to teach the boys and two new buildings were to be erected: a school for the older girls and a residence for the brothers. Both buildings were designed by the newly formed firm of architects, GHM Addison and Son and HS MacDonald, and the builder of the monastery was Dan Gallogly.

George Frederick Addison studied in Brisbane and trained in the office of his father, George Henry Male Addison. After serving in World War I he became a partner in his father's practice which had been responsible for the design of many buildings for the Catholic Church. After GHM Addison died in 1922, GF Addison continued the practice before forming a partnership with Herbert Stanley MacDonald in 1928. Their other projects included the Syncarpia block of flats at New Farm (1934), the former Queensland National Bank at South Brisbane (1929), the Goondiwindi Civic Centre (1938), and a large number of hotel commissions (mostly renovations) for Castlemaine Perkins.

James Duhig was born in Ireland and arrived with his family in Brisbane in 1885. He was ordained a priest in 1896 and in 1905 became Bishop of Rockhampton, at the age of 32. In 1912, he became Archbishop Robert Dunne's Co-Adjutor, taking on much of his administrative duties. Duhig energetically promoted the growth of the Church in Queensland. To this end, he was intimately involved throughout his career with the planning and building of over one hundred churches and schools. The first Catholic Brisbane parishes were established at Coorparoo, Kangaroo Point, South Brisbane, Red Hill and Rosalie. Although Dunne had encouraged only the Sisters of Mercy and the Christian Brothers to establish branches of their orders in Queensland, Duhig was keen to encourage other religious orders to expand Catholic education in this State. He made approaches to several teaching orders including the Marist Brothers.

The Marist Brothers, an order originating in France and expanding to 33 countries throughout the world came as missionaries to the Pacific in 1857 before arriving in Sydney in 1872 to establish their first antipodean school at St Patrick's, Church Hill, followed by several others in inner Sydney. They opened schools in Victoria and South Australia and began negotiations in 1919 to open a school in Queensland. The Marist Brothers had been invited to Manly parish but found the premises unsuitable so Archbishop Duhig negotiated an agreement to establish a school and residence for the Brothers at Rosalie which was to be their 28th establishment in Australia. The arrival of the Marist Brothers was seen as "a red letter day" for Queensland where previously the Christian Brothers had a monopoly over the higher education of Catholic boys.

The foundation stone of the Rosalie monastery was laid on 29 July 1928 by Bartholomew Catteneo the Apostolic Delegate, Archbishop James Duhig, and parish priest, Dean W Lee with Br Reginald Moore, the Director of Lismore representing the Marist Brothers Provincial. The site chosen for the monastery was adjacent to the school building on Fernberg Road which was renovated and remodelled to accommodate the classes of boys that the brothers would teach. In December 1928 three Marist brothers arrived to open the Rosalie boys' school which commenced on 28 January 1929 with an enrolment of 135. The official opening of both the monastery and the girls' school, which was attached to the Convent of Mercy, by Archbishop James Duhig took place on 20 February 1929 by which time the enrolments at the boys' school had increased to 175 with grades three, four and five offered. An article in the Telegraph dated January 29, 1929 reported:

The monastery, which is an entirely new building is a fine structure designed to give the maximum of comfort and convenience. On the ground floor are a study room, dining room, reception room, kitchen and housekeeper's flat in addition to a beautifully furnished chapel, equipped with an attractively finished altar, kneeling stands, brass candle sticks, sanctuary lamp etc. Upstairs are the sleeping quarters consisting of seven bedrooms, bathrooms and community rooms. On both floors wide verandahs run completely round the building and from these a commanding view is obtained, the monastery being situated at a high point. A feature of every room is the splendid ventilation and natural and artificial light. The furnishings and decoration are effective without being elaborate. The building appears to be faithfully built of weatherboard, brick and cement.

In April 1929 the school was approved as a secondary school and by the end of that year five boys had won scholarships to the school and a few boarders had been taken in. The first secondary class of 1930 was accommodated upstairs in the monastery with six scholarship boys, some of the older boys, plus seven boarders. There were also 220 primary students. In 1935, a cottage was moved adjacent to the monastery from a site on Beck Street, and was remodelled and refitted for use as two classrooms and a boarders' dormitory until 1948.

With enrolments at the schools increasing to 450 in the late 1930s, the construction of a new college building was planned. During 1937–1938 a design was prepared and tenders were called for a hip-roofed two-storeyed masonry building with basement to accommodate 400 students. The new building, which was to contain eight classrooms, two science laboratories, a gymnasium and sheltered playing area was designed by architects Cullen and Egan. The widespread economic depression of the early 1930s, followed by the impact of World War II from 1939 to 1945, and perhaps the imminent opening of a new Marist college at Ashgrove where all the Rosalie boarders and 120 day boys were transferred in 1940, caused the project to be delayed for many years.

Frank Lee Cullen, Archbishop Duhig's nephew, trained as an articled pupil with Hennessy, Hennessy and Co, first at Leo Drinan's office in Brisbane in 1928 and then in Sydney between 1929 and 1932. Cullen returned briefly to the Brisbane office in 1933 before taking up a position with the Queensland Works Department as a draftsman. After completing his architectural education in 1934, Cullen worked with Harold Vivian Marsh Brown of Mackay before beginning his own practice in Brisbane in 1936. Cullen had several commissions that year for the Catholic Church, including a two-storey boarding school at Murgon, a brick school at Yeronga, a church at Buranda, school hall at Graceville and a presbytery at Holland Park.

In 1937 Cullen formed a partnership with Desmond Egan who had also worked with Hennessy and Hennessy in the 1920s and 1930s. The partnership received a large number of commissions from the Catholic Church as well as designing numerous hotels, residences and commercial buildings. Following the death of Egan in 1941 Cullen continued his practice as FL Cullen with new projects including several school buildings similar to the Rosalie College for the Catholic Church: St Mary's at Ipswich (1946); St Luke's at Buranda (1949); Our Lady Star of the Sea School at Gladstone (1950) and St Joseph's at Kangaroo Point (1951).

On 6 June 1948 the foundation stone for a new college building at Rosalie was laid by Archbishop Duhig at a large ceremony attended by 2,000 people including parishioners, Queensland Premier Ned Hanlon and Minister for Works and MLA for Baroona, William Joseph Power. Sixteen months later, another 2,000 people attended the opening of the school on 2 October 1949. In his address, Archbishop Duhig commended the Marist Brothers on "their struggle against adverse conditions in the matter of building and equipment". It had only been when the former 1898 church, which was the main portion of their school, threatened to collapse that they were able to get a permit from the Catholic Finance and Building Commission to build the new school, which Duhig described as a "finely, well-equipped modern building, outstanding in every respect". Duhig also praised the exemplary sacrifice that the pastor and the parish had made and "doubted if there had ever been a working man's parish in the history of Australia that had undertaken to build a school entailing the outlay of so large a sum of money".

The school, a memorial to fallen Maristonians (past students) of World War I and World War II, was constructed to a new design by Cullen and was built by KD Morris and Sons for £35,000. The three storey college was built of fire-resisting construction and contained eight large classrooms and two science laboratories. The lower ground floor incorporated a large assembly hall complete with stage, a sports store, tuckshop and lavatories. The principal's office was located on the ground floor opening off the main entrance vestibule as was the memorial library. The class rooms and science laboratories were complete with modern educational facilities and all class rooms were newly furnished with dual and single desks. An incinerator incorporated into the building served each of the floors and a public address system was installed to allow for the broadcasting of messages and programmes to all or any number of the classes. The design also provided for the later addition of an extra storey.

With the construction of the new college, the monastery became primarily a residence for the teaching brothers and continues in this function. It is also used as a meeting place for parents and students.

In 1970 Rosalie became an Archdiocesan College although it continued to be administered locally by the Marist Brothers. A Junior College was built on the north side of Fernberg Road behind the church for grades four to seven and was opened in 1971, but was phased out by 1980 due to the declining numbers in inner city parishes and the trend at the time for boys to stay at their local parish schools to complete their primary education. Its buildings and grounds became part of the Senior College.

Various other buildings and facilities were added to the grounds in the 1960s and 1970s, including a swimming pool (1965), science block (1969), library (1975) and enclosure of the basement of the college building to create a hall (1975). In 1977 a covered assembly and shelter area adjacent to the Senior block was erected.

All college buildings have been refurbished. The plaster ceilings in the monastery were replaced to match the original in recent years following water damage and ceiling repairs were carried out in the dining room. The three storey addition attached to the south-western end of the monastery verandah was built in the 1980s.

The school was controversially closed on 30 November 2008. In January 2009 the campus became the Lavalla Centre and is used by the Marist Brothers for teacher in-service training and retreats. The local Catholic parish organises youth activities on the site.

== Description ==
Marist Brothers' Monastery and Marist College, Rosalie are located within the inner western suburb of Paddington about three kilometres from the city of Brisbane. The north facing buildings are situated on Fernberg Road at the end of the Given Terrace ridge on a large elevated site that falls southward in a series of terraces to Beck Street and contains other structures, playing fields and sports facilities.

=== Monastery ===
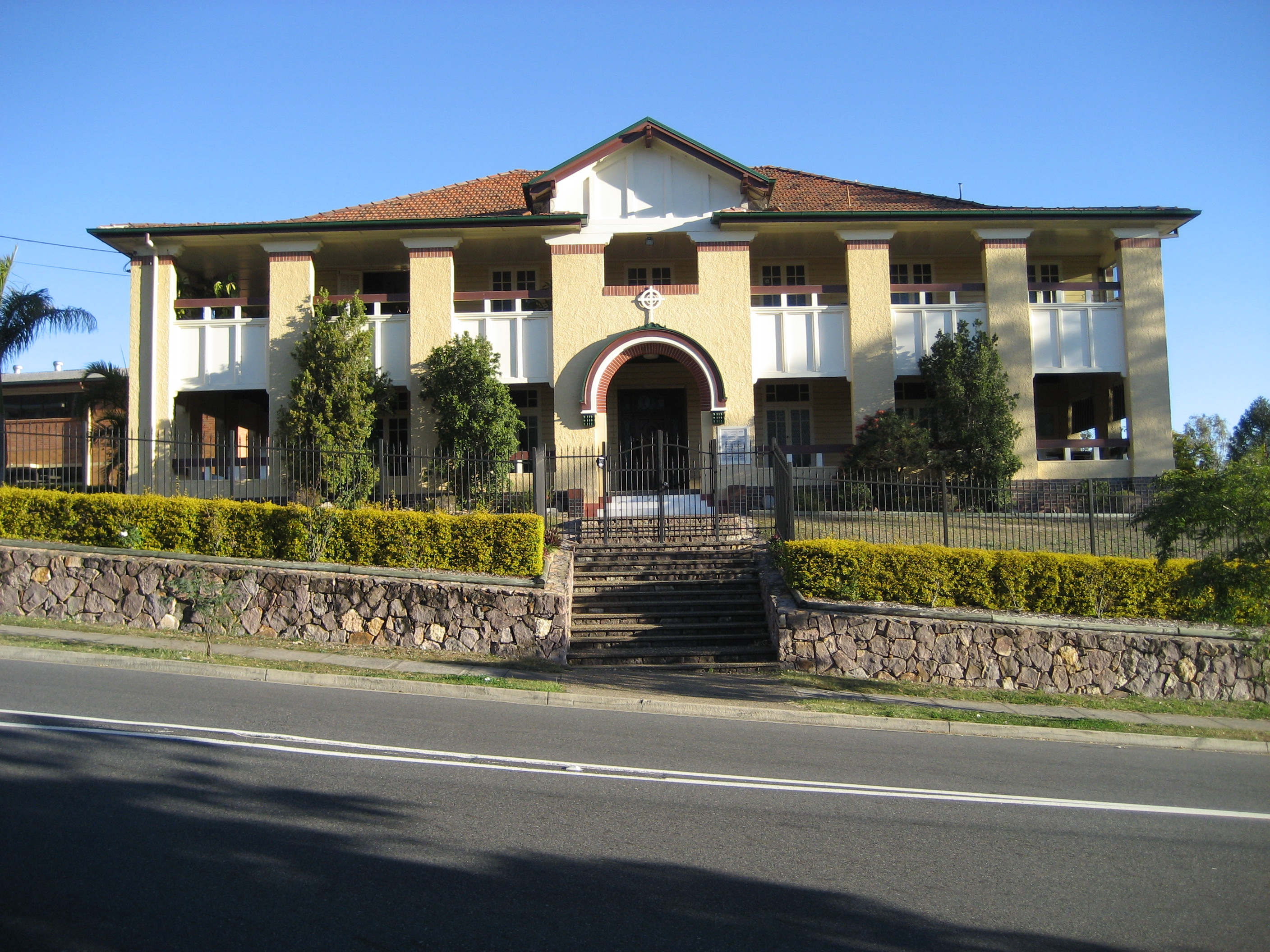
Monastery, 2007

Monastery Marist Brothers' Monastery is sited above Fernberg Road, adjacent to the College on the westward downhill slope. The monastery is a symmetrical, two-storeyed timber building clad in chamferboards with encircling verandahs. It is elevated on a tuck-pointed glazed dark brown face-brick base formed in English bond which supports rough-cast rendered masonry verandah columns on three sides. The columns, with a dark brown brick soldier course below moulded capitals, support the hipped terracotta tiled roof which has a pitch break at the line of the verandah.

The northern (front) elevation comprises a central gabled pediment over the main entrance - a large round arched opening projecting forward on decorative corbels. The arch is surmounted by a celtic cross located in front of a solid masonry balustrade to the upper floor verandah. This central bay is flanked on each side by three verandah columns between which oversized timber handrails are supported on a large timber framed balustrade/valance with fibrous cement sheet infill panels to the upper floor and on a solid rendered masonry balustrade to the ground floor.

The verandah detailing continues on the side elevations which comprise five bays. On the eastern elevation there is an opening to the garden at ground level in the central bay and the last bay in the southern corner on the first floor is enclosed with multi-pane sliding timber windows. On the western elevation, four bays on the upper floor verandah and three bays on the lower floor verandah have been enclosed with metal framed sliding windows. Door openings in the dark brick base provide access to the understorey.

The southern elevation has timber verandah posts supported on dark brick piers with an open balustrade supporting the oversized handrail to the ground floor and sliding multi-pane timber windows and fixed glazing to each of the upper floor bays. Timber battens line the understorey openings. The three storey rendered masonry addition built in the 1970s and attached by an enclosed walkway at the western end of the southern verandah has been detailed to match the existing building and houses a garage on the ground floor and bathrooms on the upper floors.

The recessed main entrance contains an entry door, detailed to resemble a celtic cross with a circular leadlight panel depicting the initials of the Society of Mary, set within sidelights and fanlights decorated with celtic patterned leadlight. The entrance foyer, with parquetry floor, decorative plaster ceiling and panelled walls with plaque rails, opens onto the reception room to the east and the study to the west. The stairwell is located opposite the entrance foyer and is separated from it by a hall that runs transversely between the two. The ground floor rooms are large and well-proportioned and have higher ceilings than the first floor rooms and fanlights over most doors. The chapel, containing original furniture, is located at the eastern end of the hall in the south-east corner, the recently refurbished kitchen is located in the south-west corner and the dining room in the north-west corner at the western end of the hall. The housekeeper's flat was attached at the rear of the house and no longer survives.

The upper floor has bedrooms and a communal room that open off the central hall and a wide sleeping verandah to the rear that has sliding glass windows in timber frames set in the upper half of the exterior wall.

Like the exterior, the interior is largely intact. All the rooms are lined with vertical v-jointed tongue and groove boards, the ceilings are moulded fibrous plaster and the joinery is generally clear finished silky oak with a lamb's tongue profile. Multi-pane French doors with obscure glazing open onto the verandahs from most of the rooms.

=== College ===
Marist College is large three-storeyed brick masonry building positioned prominently at the end of the ridge at the junction of Fernberg Road and Given Terrace at Rosalie. Situated on a sloping site, only the upper two storeys and windows of the ground floor are visible from Fernberg Road.

The building is constructed of a light coloured brick in stretcher bond and the solid, monumental, asymmetrical massing of the exterior form follows its internal function. A wide L-shaped entrance stair toward the western end of the building is concealed from view from Fernberg Road by a large solid balustrade with concrete capping. This leads to the entrance foyer which is located asymmetrically within a volume that projects forward toward the street and above the adjacent western stairwell and north facing corridor that gives access to the rooms on all three levels. Each of the volumes has low pitched metal roofs which are drained by box gutters to rainwater heads and downpipes that are concealed behind the parapet walls.

The front elevation features a strong horizontal component created by continuous concrete hoods over five bays of hopper windows to the three floors. This horizontality is accentuated with the use of continuous concrete sills, parapet copings and cappings of similar profile. There is no additional embellishment except for a simple recessed crucifix form in brown face-brick at the eastern end of the front elevation and the more recent addition of a large crucifix set against a light coloured panel adjacent to the main entrance. Metal hoods to ventilation bricks, which occur at regular intervals on all floors, are a later addition.

On the eastern elevation, narrow fixed glazing provides natural light to the north-eastern stairwell and on the projecting eastern end of the classroom wing, six louvred windows to the ground floor and six double-hung windows to the first and second floors, under continuous concrete hoods, provide natural light and ventilation to the toilets and classrooms respectively. The bays of double-hung windows and concrete hoods to the first and second floors continue to four of the five bays on the southern elevation and on the ground floor there are double hung windows and a roller shutter to the counter of the tuckshop. Later doors have replaced the roller doors to the former hall and a large roofed open area has been constructed between the college building and the library to the south. A ground-level entrance on the western elevation provides access to the rear of the tuckshop and northern corridor. Hopper windows and narrow fixed glazing provide light and ventilation to the western stairwell where chutes to the incinerator are located on the half landings.

Like the exterior, the interior of the building is simple and functional in design and finish. The first and second floors contain five classrooms separated by masonry walls and the floors are suspended reinforced concrete. The classroom interiors were rendered and the face brick corridors are now painted. The entrance foyer located on the first floor has large glazed entrance doors, sidelights and fanlights of silky oak. It has a ventilated plaster ceiling decorated with simple mouldings and a fluted cornice detail. Alterations to this floor in 1997 were extensive and included the conversion of the classrooms into offices by the introduction of an additional hallway down the centre and length of the classroom room wing and timber framed partition walls. Three of the five classrooms doors and windows to the northern corridor have been bricked in.

The stairwells and the five classrooms and corridor on the second floor are largely intact. The ceilings are lined with fibrous cement sheeting and cover battens and the floors are carpeted. Pairs of doors and double hung windows in the northern walls of the classrooms that admit light and provide cross ventilation are intact. On the ground floor the volume of the hall survives although it has been adapted for other uses. The tuckshop has been refurbished.

== Heritage listing ==
Marist Brothers College Rosalie Buildings were listed on the Queensland Heritage Register on 18 September 2008 having satisfied the following criteria.

The place is important in demonstrating the evolution or pattern of Queensland's history.

The monastery and college are important as evidence of the period of expansion of the Catholic Church in Queensland under the leadership of Archbishop James Duhig. The Marist Brothers' Monastery and school for boys at Fernberg Road, Rosalie were opened in 1929 as part of Duhig's vision for the development of the Church in Queensland through the provision of affordable, high quality Catholic education.

The monastery and college occupy a prominent site in the inner western suburbs of Brisbane and are a manifestation of the Catholic ethos of selecting imposing sites to produce landmarks which is characteristic of buildings erected for the Church during the time of Archbishop Duhig.

Marist Brothers' Monastery and Marist College Rosalie were the first Queensland residence and school of the Marist Brothers' order, which has made a significant and influential contribution to the education, particularly secondary education, of Catholic boys in Queensland. At Rosalie, the Marist Brothers have continued to provide a religious education to generations of boys over an 80-year period. The school developed into a regional college with the erection in 1949 of the Sacred Heart Memorial College, funded largely by the endeavours of the local community.

The place is important in demonstrating the principal characteristics of a particular class of cultural places.

The monastery is important as the first commission of the newly formed partnership of architects, GHM Addison and Son and HS MacDonald which continued the association of GHM Addison's practice with the Rosalie parish. The monastery is an excellent example of a residence purpose-built for the accommodation of a religious order. The building and some early furnishings including original chapel furniture remain intact and illustrative of its original and continued function as the home of the Marist Brothers with chapel, reception room, study, dining room and kitchen on the ground floor and bedrooms and communal room on the upper floor set on a hilltop adjacent to the school where the Brothers taught.

The college is a good representative example of the work of architect Frank Cullen, Archbishop Duhig's nephew, who was responsible for the design of many Catholic schools, churches, presbyteries and halls during the 1930s-1950s. Its simple yet functional design and solid monumental asymmetrical massing are typical of the style of school building that Cullen was designing in the 1940s.

The place is important because of its aesthetic significance.

Situated on the end of the ridge at the southern end of Given Terrace, Marist College has landmark quality for its solid, monumental asymmetrical composition that is visible from a number of viewpoints.

The monastery located adjacent to the school is also valued for its landmark qualities as a well composed and visually pleasing building on a prominent site. Additional aesthetic values are derived from the integrity of the buildings architectural qualities and workmanship both internally and externally including its generous planning and proportions and restrained yet effective detailing and finishes, its oversized verandah elements, its symmetrical planning, the proportions of its rooms, the detailing of its joinery.

The place has a strong or special association with a particular community or cultural group for social, cultural or spiritual reasons.

The monastery have a special association for generations of Catholic families who have sent their sons to this school since 1929 and have been important for several generations of Catholics in the surrounding area as a source of spiritual, social and educational sustenance. Past and present pupils and teachers share a strong sense of attachment to the college, the construction of which was delayed due to the Second World War and which was dedicated as a memorial to past students who died during both World Wars.

The place has a special association with the life or work of a particular person, group or organisation of importance in Queensland's history.

The monastery and college have a strong, special and continuing association with the Marist Brothers, the order that founded the boys' school at Rosalie in 1929 and for whom the monastery was purpose-built.
