= Poutasi Luafutu =

NZ rugby union player

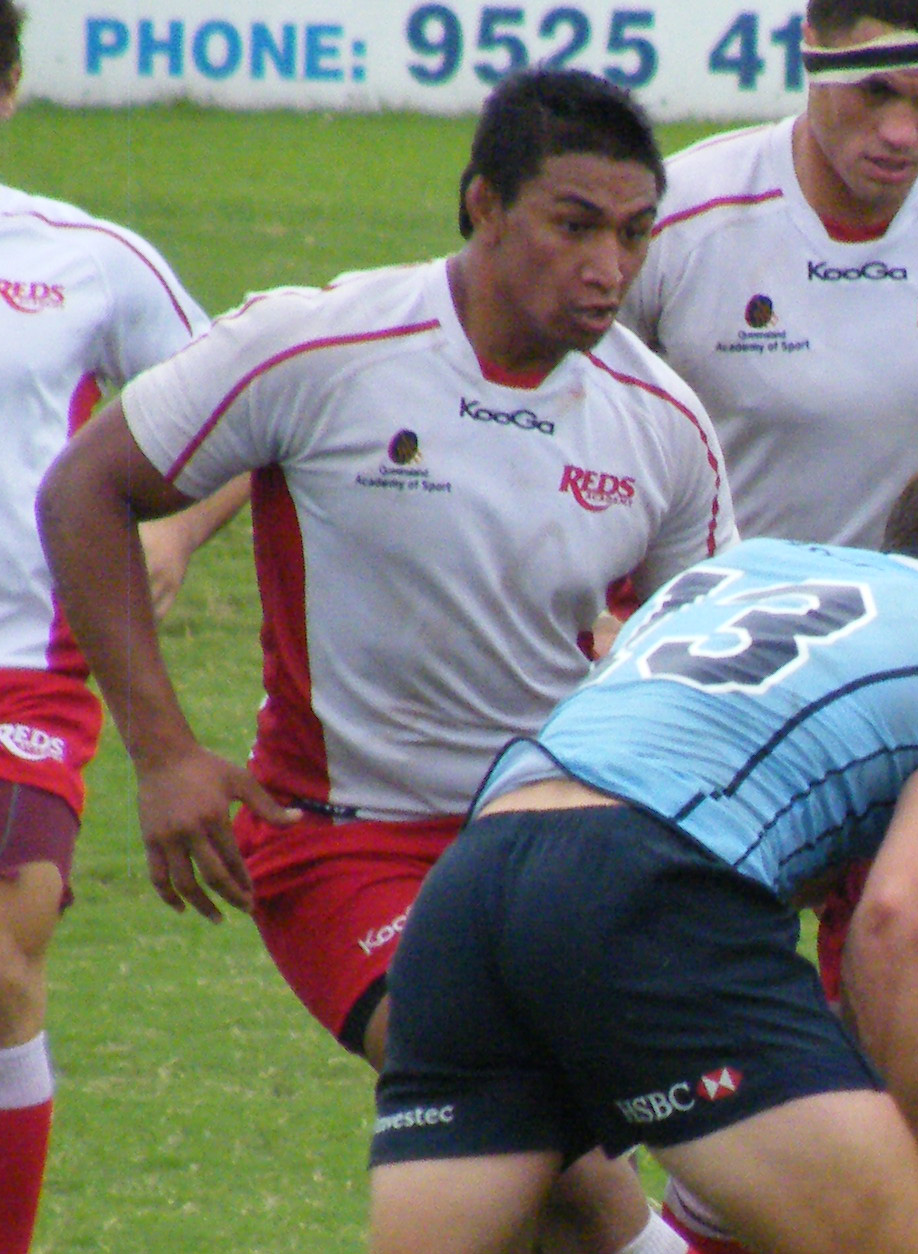
- Born: Poutasi Vaiofiso Tuasivi Luafutu; 2 December 1987 (age 38) Invercargill, New Zealand
- Height: 186 cm (6 ft 1 in)
- Weight: 111 kg (17 st 7 lb)
- School: Marist College Rosalie

Rugby union career
- Position: Back row
- Current team: Provence
Senior career
Years	Team	Apps	(Points)
2011–2018	Brive	137	(50)
2013–2014	→ Bordeaux Bègles (loan)	15	(0)
2018–	Provence	1	(0)
- Correct as of 19 August 2018
Super Rugby
Years	Team	Apps	(Points)
2008–2010	Queensland Reds	16	(10)

Poutasi Vaiofiso Tuasivi Luafutu (born 2 December 1987) is a New Zealand born Australian rugby union footballer. He currently plays for Provence Rugby in the Rugby Pro D2. He signed from the Queensland Reds of Super Rugby. He can play anywhere in the backrow.

== Early years ==
He started playing rugby league for the Redbank Bears at the age of 10 before switching codes at the age of 12 to play for the Riverview and Districts Junior Rugby Union Club. He was also a keen volleyball and basketball player as a student at Marist College Rosalie.

== Playing career ==
=== Super 14 ===
Luafutu made his debut for the Reds in the 2008 Super 14 season against the Bulls. He established himself within the Reds' revival during the 2010 Super 14 season among many other players in the somewhat inexperienced forward pack. He is most noted for his efforts in the Reds' final game of the season against the Highlanders at the Suncorp Stadium, coming off the bench to score 2 tries, the second to win the match with 2 minutes remaining.

=== Top 14 ===
After signing to Brive, he's named the "Black BOD", or the "New Nonu" because he scored 2 tries in only 2 games.
