= Marist Brothers College Rosalie =

Coordinates: 27°27′50.27″S 152°59′57.97″E

Marist College Rosalie
- Paddington, Brisbane, Queensland; Australia

Information
- Type: Independent, Roman Catholic, single-sex, secondary
- Motto: Latin: Age quod agis (Whatever you do, do wholeheartedly and well)
- Established: 1929
- Closed: 2008
- Grades: 8–12
- Colors: Cerise and blue

Sacred Heart College, also known as Marist Brothers Rosalie, was a Catholic boys' college located in Paddington, an inner western suburb of Brisbane, Queensland, Australia. The college had been a high school for students in grades 8 to 12, but was closed at the end of 2008. Some of the school buildings were heritage-listed on the Queensland Heritage Register in 2008.

== Grounds and campus ==
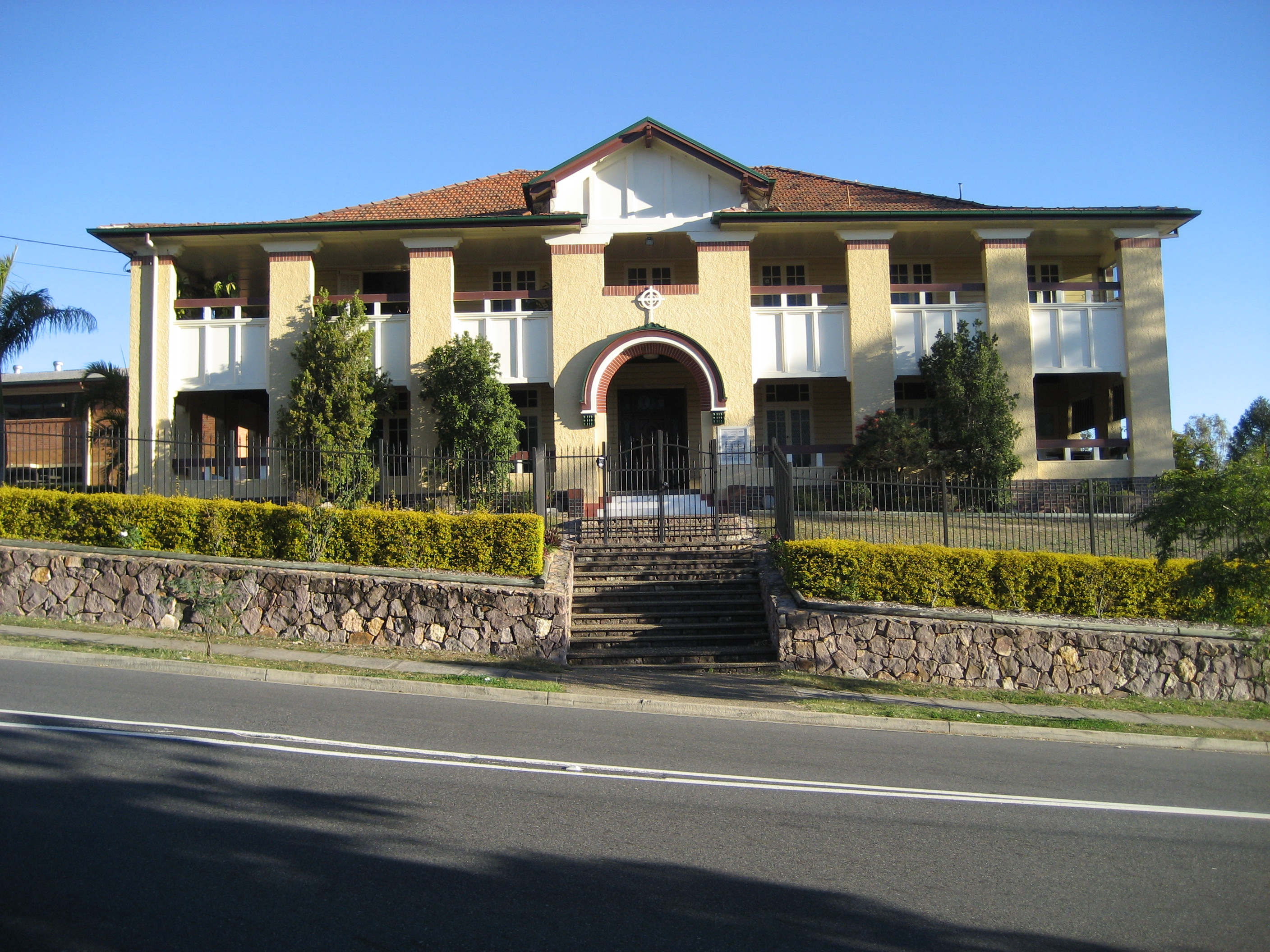
The Brothers House

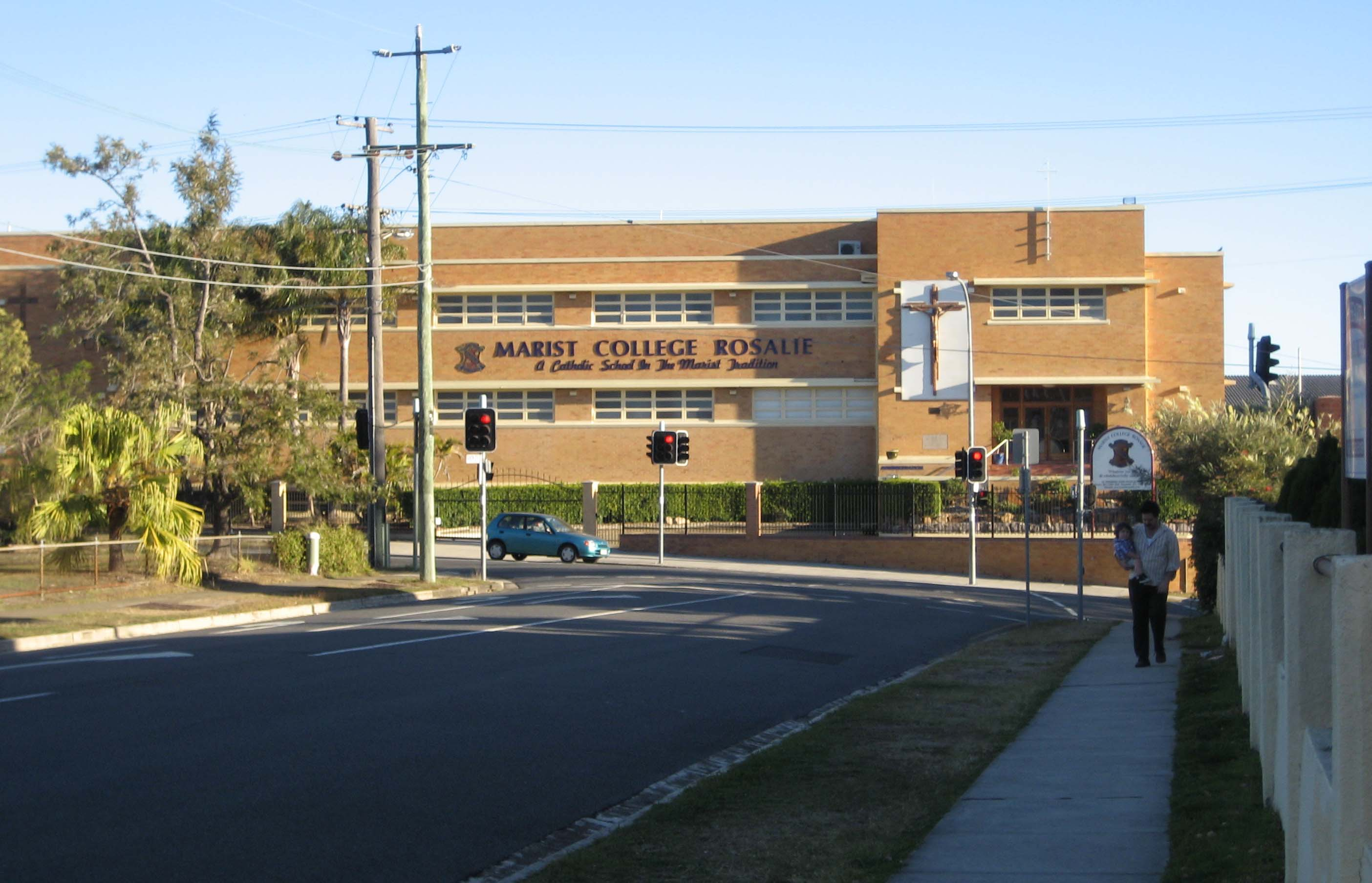
The High School

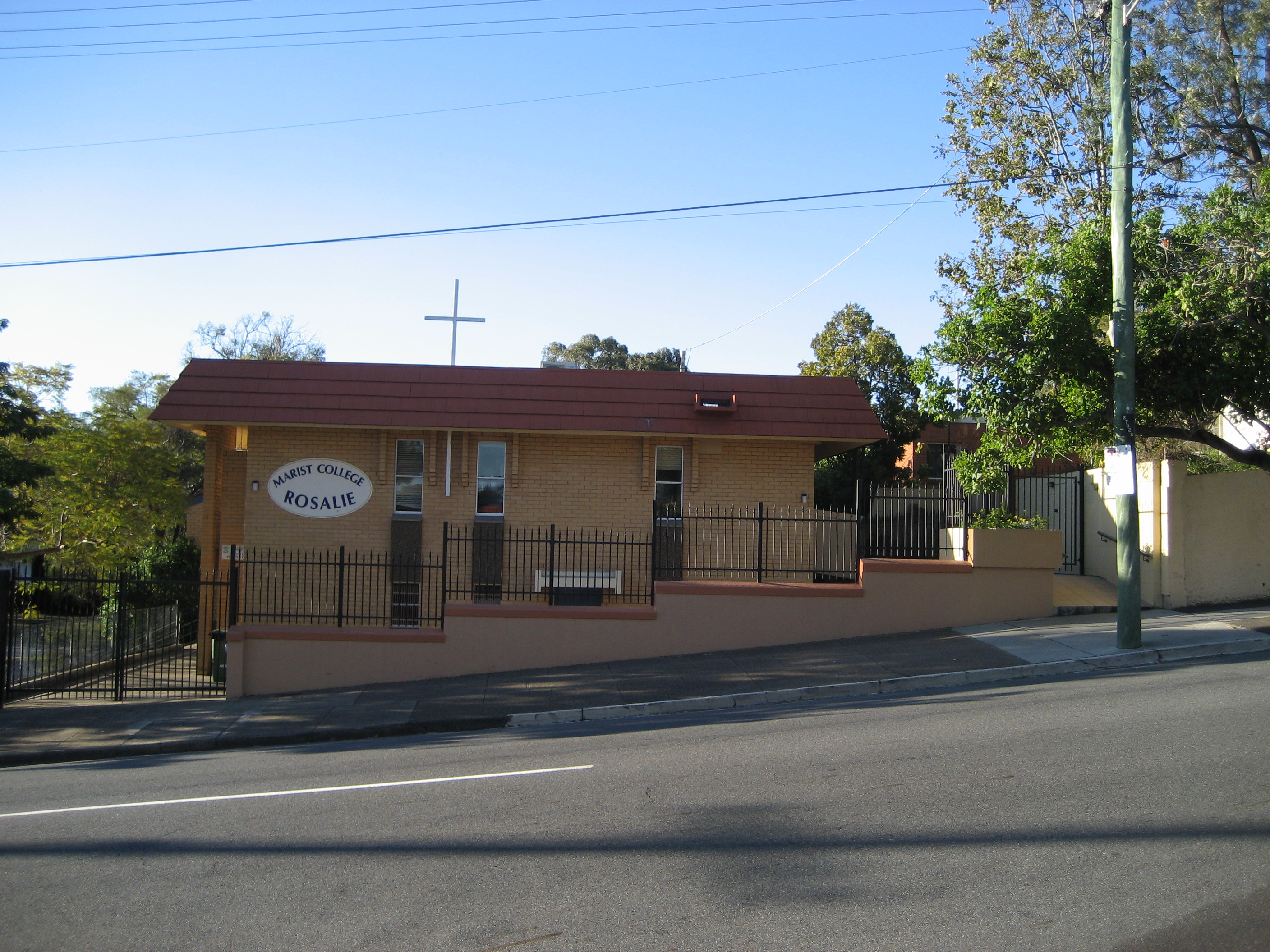
The High School

Adjacent to the school are a number of Catholic buildings still owned by the Parish. At 369 Given Terrace stands the large red brick Sacred Heart Church, built in 1917. Immediately across the road at 333 Given Terrace is the "Sacred Heart Primary School" (consisting of 5 small buildings) for grades 1–7, now closed but used by other Catholic groups. Behind that is a brick community hall constructed in 1978. There is also a parish priest residence on Given Terrace and a smaller building on the corner of Fernberg Road and Given Terrace that stands where the parish’s original wooden church stood. The original wooden church was constructed and formally blessed by Archbishop Robert Dunne on 10 March 1907 and was used until the large brick church was built in 1917, and thereafter it was used for primary school schooling until it burnt down in the 1970s. Finally at 327 Given Terrace there is the Sacred Heart Convent built in 1918 which was owned and used by the Sisters of Mercy order of nuns (who had commenced teaching in the parish in 1905) until sold by them in 2005.

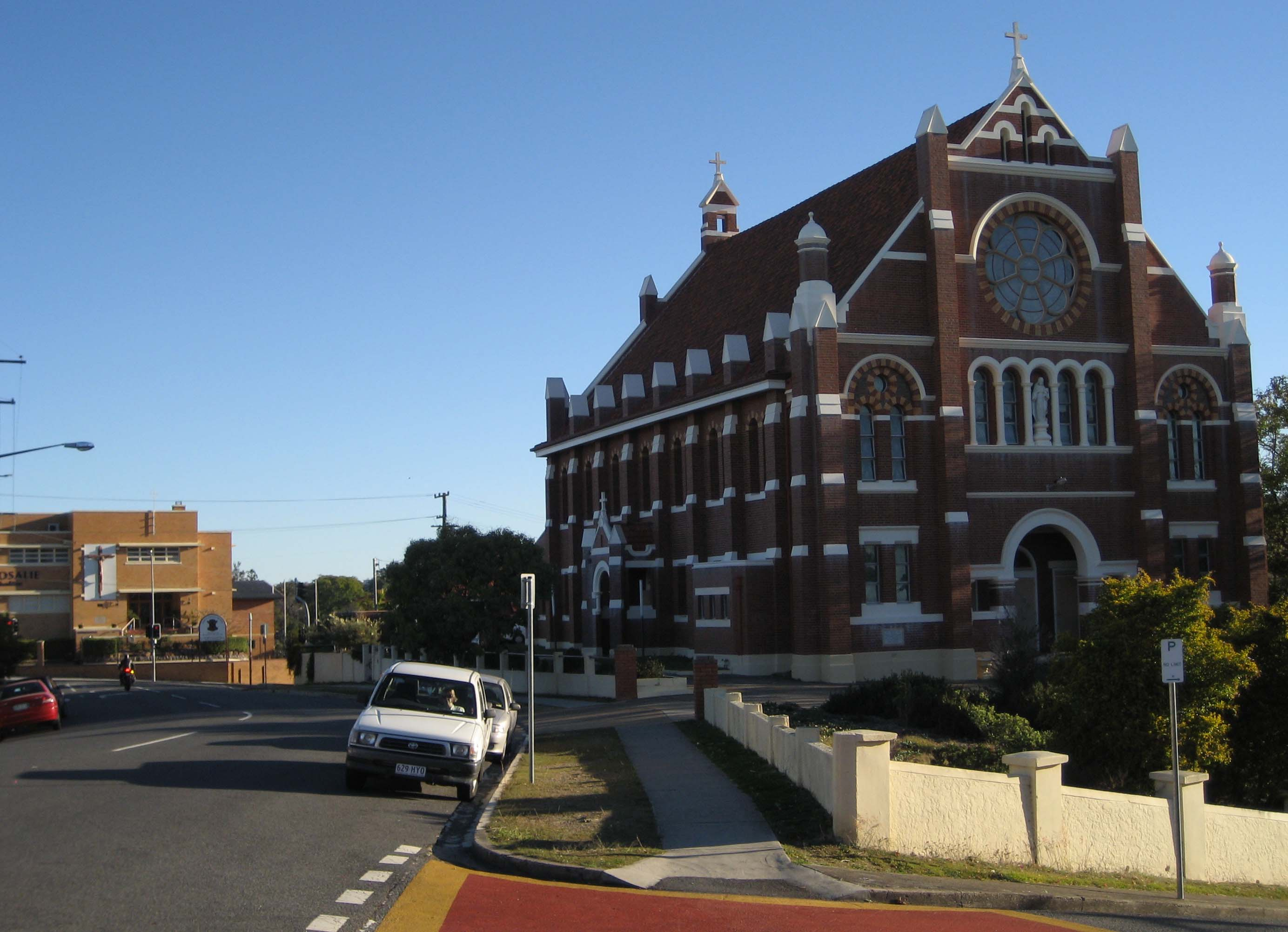
Sacred Heart Church with Marist Brothers Rosalie in the background

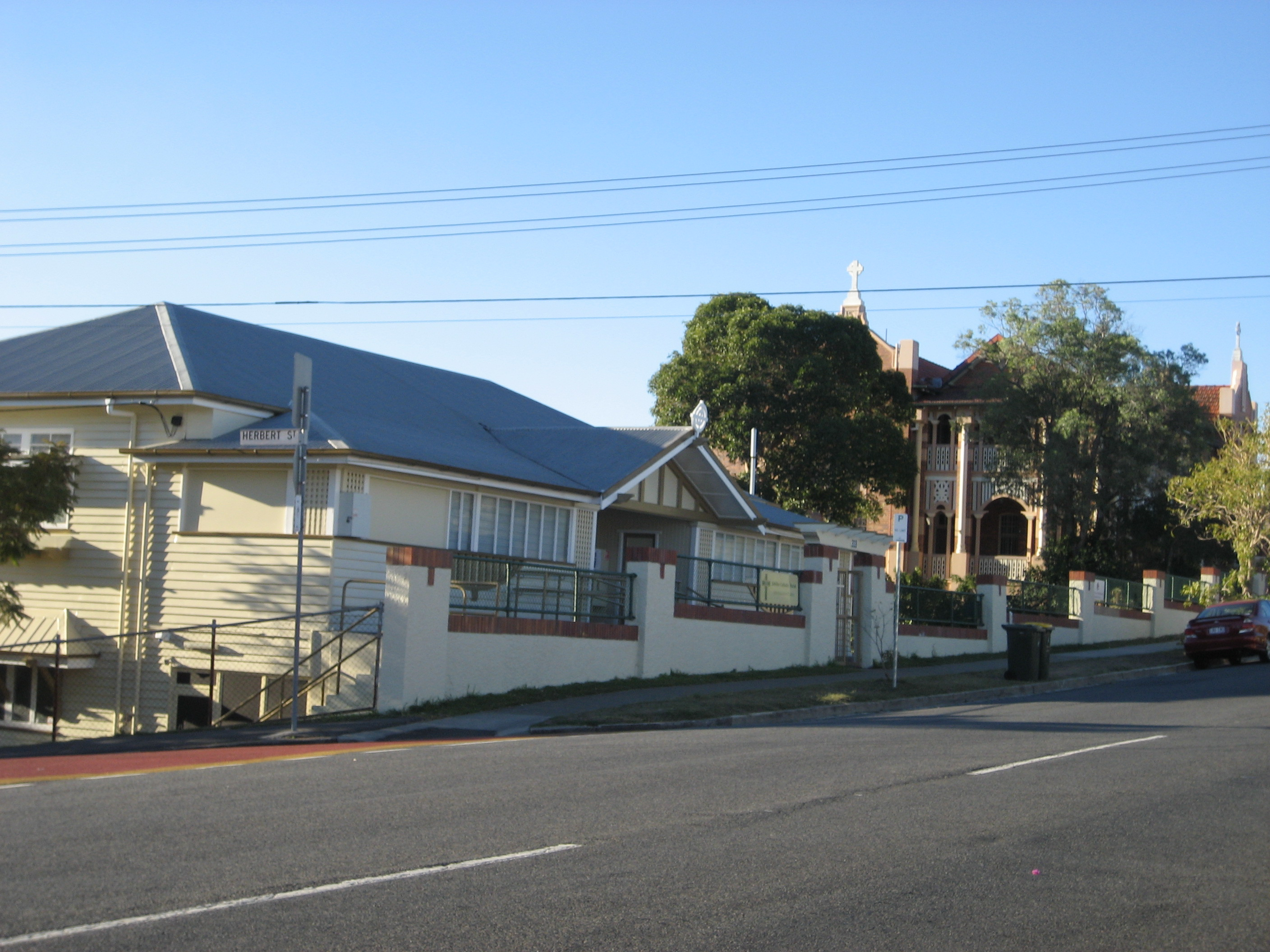
The Sacred Heart Convent "old" building, with former Sisters of Mercy residence in background

== History ==
Marist Brothers Rosalie is an example of the history of Catholic Education in Queensland, and stands as a testament to the influence of the Catholic “architect” and “builder” of Brisbane, Archbishop James Duhig. In 1912, Archbishop Duhig was made adjudicator of Brisbane and then Archbishop of Brisbane in 1917. He instigated a period of expansion in the Catholic Church resulting in the building and rebuilding of churches, schools and convents that lasted well into until the 1940s. What makes the Archbishop’s vision was considered impressive since this expansion occurred during the financially difficult time of the Great Depression and during uncertain times of World War One and World War Two. At the time, young men were at war and construction material and labor was difficult to obtain. The hills across Brisbane are dotted with Catholic education buildings built on land purchased by the Archbishop during this period as part of his vision for the future. As Archbishop of Brisbane for fifty years, he oversaw the construction of more than four hundred major church buildings.

At the same time as Duhig's "construction" the Marist order was invited (although the Marists taught at as far back as 1919 in the Rosalie parish), as were the Brigidine Sisters, Christian Brothers, and Josephite nuns to educate the Catholic families of Brisbane in these new buildings, and they became an integral part of Queensland's religious cultural history.

In line with Archbishop Duhig’s vision the Rosalie monastery was the Marist Order's first house in Queensland and the foundation stone of the Marist Brothers' Monastery was officially laid on 29 July 1928 by His Excellency B. Catteneo. The construction was completed and ready for the new school year and was officially opened on 20 February 1929 by Archbishop Duhig. One hundred and thirty-five students were enrolled, a large number coming from the Convent School at Rosalie. The monastery was also used as a boarding residence until 1940.

Those responsible for the design of the monastery were George Frederick Addison, son of prominent architect George Henry Male Addison, and G. F. Macdonald. After his father's death in 1922, the majority of Addison's work would be residential. He designed over thirty homes before his retirement in 1938. In designing the Marist Brothers Monastery, G.F. Addison was continuing a family connection with the Catholic Church as his father's last commission had been the neighbouring church of the Sacred Heart at Rosalie in 1918. G.H.M. Addison designed several other ecclesiastical buildings for the Catholic Church including: the Coorparoo Presbytery (1914); St. Columba's Church, Wilston (1915); St. Benedict's Church, East Brisbane (1917) and the Church of the Little Flower, Kedron (1924). This site stands as a purpose-built, landmark religious structure in Brisbane's Catholic Archdiocese. Its aesthetic significance and association with Brisbane architect, George Frederick Addison, who was continuing the connection of his father, G.H.M. Addison, to the Catholic Church, is a legacy that has been recognised in need of protection and preservation by the Queensland government "heritage listing" process.

Eventually, modern school buildings were constructed, and the Monastery became primarily a residence for the teaching brothers of Marist College, Rosalie. It continues in this function today, as well as being a meeting place for parents and students of the College. It is a landmark structure in Rosalie's residential and Catholic precinct.

Marist Brothers Rosalie took some boarders during the 1930s but this ceased with the opening of Marist College Ashgrove in 1940. By 1939 the Marist College Rosalie roll was four hundred and fifty-one students. It was clear that a new college was necessary. Again under the guiding hand and vision of Archbishop Duhig plans were put in place for a new school building.

The present senior college was officially blessed and opened by Archbishop Duhig on 2 October 1949 at a cost of 35,000 pounds. A crowd of nearly two thousand people attended the opening including the Labor Premier (a staunch Catholic and local resident), Ned Hanlon and the Works Minister, Mr. William Power. Another one of the official guests caused quite a stir at the time. Present at the laying of the foundation stone was Irish hero, revolutionary, president of Sien Fein, Taoiseach (Prime Minister) of Ireland (from 1932–1948, 1951–1954 and 1957–1959) and future President of Ireland (for two seven-year terms from 1959–1973), Éamon de Valera. Mr de Valera was travelling around Australia, at the invitation of a bishop, to speak and associate with the many Irish immigrants who had made Australia their home. At the ceremony at Rosalie, Mr de Valera said, according to press reports at the time, that “...the new school was part of the evidence of the magnificent works of charity and community effort that he had seen in every capital of the Commonwealth.”

It was at this time that Archbishop Duhig’s vision was finally fulfilled, that is schooling of Catholic boys from grade 1 to grade 12. As the school grew further building projects that were funded by the Parents and Friends Association including the building of the swimming pool (1965), the science block (1969) and the library block (1975).

In 1955, the school acquired 22 acres (89,000 m^{2}) of bushland in the suburb of Fig Tree Pocket, in Brisbane’s west and rechristened the land “Lavalla”. Luton White, owner of a chain of garages, sold his land cheaply to the Marist Brothers and the parish at the time on the basis that it be used by the students of Rosalie College for their sports. The visionary Principal, Brother Cyprian Dowd (1935–41, 1953–59), grabbed this opportunity. Brother Cyprian, by all accounts, was a tireless worker and he “marshalled the troops" and over a six-month period the scrub was cleared by parents, old boys, students, members of the parish and a horse (named Dolly) to create four new sports ovals. The grounds were officially opened on 16 October 1955 by Monsignor Steele.

The school continued to grow and a Junior College (61 Fernberg Rd) for grades 4–7 was constructed in 1971 at a cost of A$142000. Archbishop Patrick Mary O'Donnell formally blessed the building on 6 June 1971.

All of these buildings have been refurbished in recent years and the Parents & Friends Association has overseen the construction of tennis courts, cricket practice wickets, basketball courts and a covered assembly area.

Although the school was built by (and largely funded by) the people of Rosalie and the surrounding parishes, in 1970 the school became an Archdiocesan College and under the control of the Brisbane Catholic Education office. In accordance to Catholic canon law this can occur only if there is no parish priest residing in the area as was the case then for a short time. That is its administration was no longer done in the community but externally at the central offices of Brisbane Catholic Education. Subsequently, Father Dennis Power, was assigned the parish however administration was not returned to the Parish. Father Power, worked tirelessly in promoting the school as well as the primary school, the Sacred Heart Convent, adjacent to the school, until his retirement in the 1990s.

At its peak, in the mid-1970s, the school (which also had junior years 4–7) had about 550 children enrolled.

Controversially, at the time, Brisbane Catholic Education decided to close the Junior College (61 Fernberg Rd) down in 1979 and it became part of the Senior College in 1980. The decision was controversial as there was no reason given for the closure except that the adjacent convent, Sacred Heart Convent, which catered for children from grades 1 – 7 was losing boys to the junior school in grade 4, meaning that the grades 4 – 7 at the convent were almost exclusively female even though the school was co-educational. This was deemed not to be in the best interests of the convent. The controversy was fuelled further by Brisbane Catholic Education’s decision to then abruptly close Sacred Heart Convent down in 1995. Unfortunately this decision to close the Junior College ( and the convent) affected the high school as it had lost its “feeder” school, a decision which was to haunt it later.

On 9 March 1989, Pope John Paul II paternally imparted a Special Apostolic Blessing as a pledge of continued divine protection on the school on the occasion of its Diamond Jubilee.

In 2000, Rosalie parish became part of cluster of three parishes with the surrounding suburbs of Red Hill and Bardon, and finally in 2005 the new larger parish was christened the Jubilee Catholic Community.

From the start of the school and in line with the Marist philosophy and to promote Catholic education amongst the working class the school fees were kept at an “affordable” rate. Accordingly, Marist College Rosalie has produced a colourful array of old boys.

The school closed on 30 November 2008. In January 2009, the campus became the Lavalla Centre and is used by the Marist Brothers for teacher in-service training and retreats. The local Catholic parish organises youth activities on the site. The Royal Commission into Institutional Historical Child Sexual Abuse, in 2017 identified two abuses. Br Kosta Chute and Br Norman Keyes. Both taught at this school, in 1953–1957 and 1952 respectively.

== Crest and motto ==
The College colours are Cerise and Blue. The Latin motto “Age Quod Agis” when translated reads “Whatever you do, do it wholeheartedly and well”. There are two symbols on the shield. On the left the Marist “M”, the international crest of the Marist Brothers order. On the right are an open book and a torch, the symbols of learning.

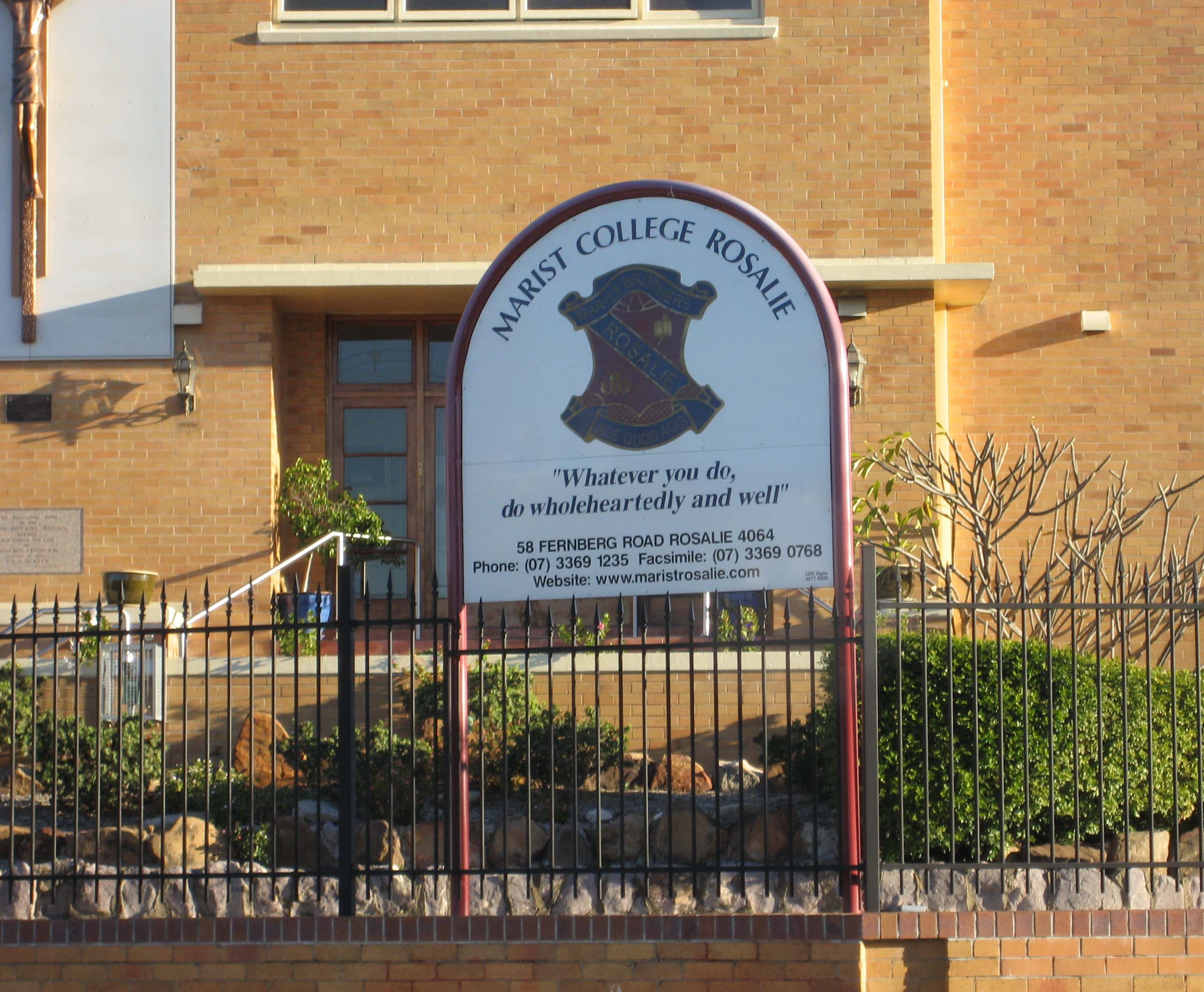
The Marist Brothers Rosalie crest

== Notable alumni ==
=== Religion ===
- Bishop John Joseph Gerry (1927–2017) – Catholic priest, Auxiliary Bishop for Brisbane.

=== Rhodes Scholars ===
- Colin Apelt – 1954 – went to Marist Rosalie and then St Joseph's Gregory Terrace for senior
- Dan Crowley (Rhodes Scholar – 1987)

=== Entertainment and the arts ===
- Peter Coman (Author) – Author of "The Paddo Boys – A baby boomer’s journey through the Seventies" (Zeus Publications, 2017). Peter Coman was raised in Paddington. His book is a memoir, in part, about growing up in the Paddington working class milieu of the 1960s and 1970s.
- Dr Joel Hodge – Theologian, author – "Resisting Violence and Victimisation: Christian Faith and Solidarity in East Timor" (2012) and Hodge, Joel, Cowdell, Scott and Fleming, Chris (eds), Violence, Desire and the Sacred: Girard’s Mimetic Theory Across the Disciplines (2012)
- The Headstones (Australian band) – four members were students at Marist Rosalie.

=== Politics and Law ===
- Peter Connolly QC, Judge of the Supreme Court of Queensland 1977–1990. The elected member (Liberal Party) of the Legislative Assembly for Kurilpa 1957 to 1960. (Justice Connolly went to Marist Rosalie until 1934 before winning a scholarship to St Joseph’s College, Gregory Terrace, where he was both Dux and Head Boy in his final year in 1936)
- Dr John Flynn Labor Party state parliamentarian Queensland, Member for Toowoomba North
- Pat Hanlon, Labor member of the Queensland Legislative Assembly
- Kev Hooper Labor Party state parliamentarian Queensland, Member for Archerfield
- Santo Santoro Liberal Party state parliamentarian Queensland, Member for Merthyr, Liberal Party senator for Queensland

=== Crime ===
- Scott Rush (convicted drug smuggler and member of Bali Nine – for the last two years of his schooling after attending and being expelled from St Laurence's College in South Brisbane) 2003

=== Business ===
- Harry Judge (1922–2008) (Surveyor and Author) He wrote "Some Tales about Measuring the Snowy Mountains" (2014) (a memoir, inter dispersed with images, maps and historic references about surveying and the journey of the first survey team in the Australian Snowy Mountains Hydro Electric Scheme in the early 1950s).
- Barry Maranta (educator, businessman, sports management, co-founder of the Brisbane Broncos rugby league team)

=== Military ===
- Terence John Corkran (1916–2006) – Pilot Officer, No. 120 Squadron (RAF), first RAAF pilot to receive the Military Cross during World War 2.
- Vincent McCosker (1923–1987) – Medical Orderly with the Australian Infantry Forces during World War 2. One of the 64 survivors on the Australian Hospital Ship AHS Centaur, a hospital ship which was torpedoed and sunk by a Japanese submarine off the coast of Queensland, on 14 May 1943.

=== Sport ===
- Hector Hogan (Athletics) Sprinter, Olympic medalist, 1956 Melbourne games
- Poutasi Luafutu (Rugby Union) Queensland representative (2008– )
- Warren Moon (Australian A grade Football / Soccer player)
- Ed O'Donoghue (Rugby Union) Queensland representative (2000s), Leinster Rugby (2010– )
- Stan Pilecki (Rugby Union), Australian Team Rugby Union Captain 1970s–1980s
