= James Cockle (disambiguation) =

Sir James Cockle (1819–1895) was an English lawyer and mathematician.

James Cockle may also refer to:

- James Cockle (surgeon) (1782–1854), his father, British surgeon
- James Cockle (speedway rider) (born 1986), professional speedway rider
