= Skilmorlie =

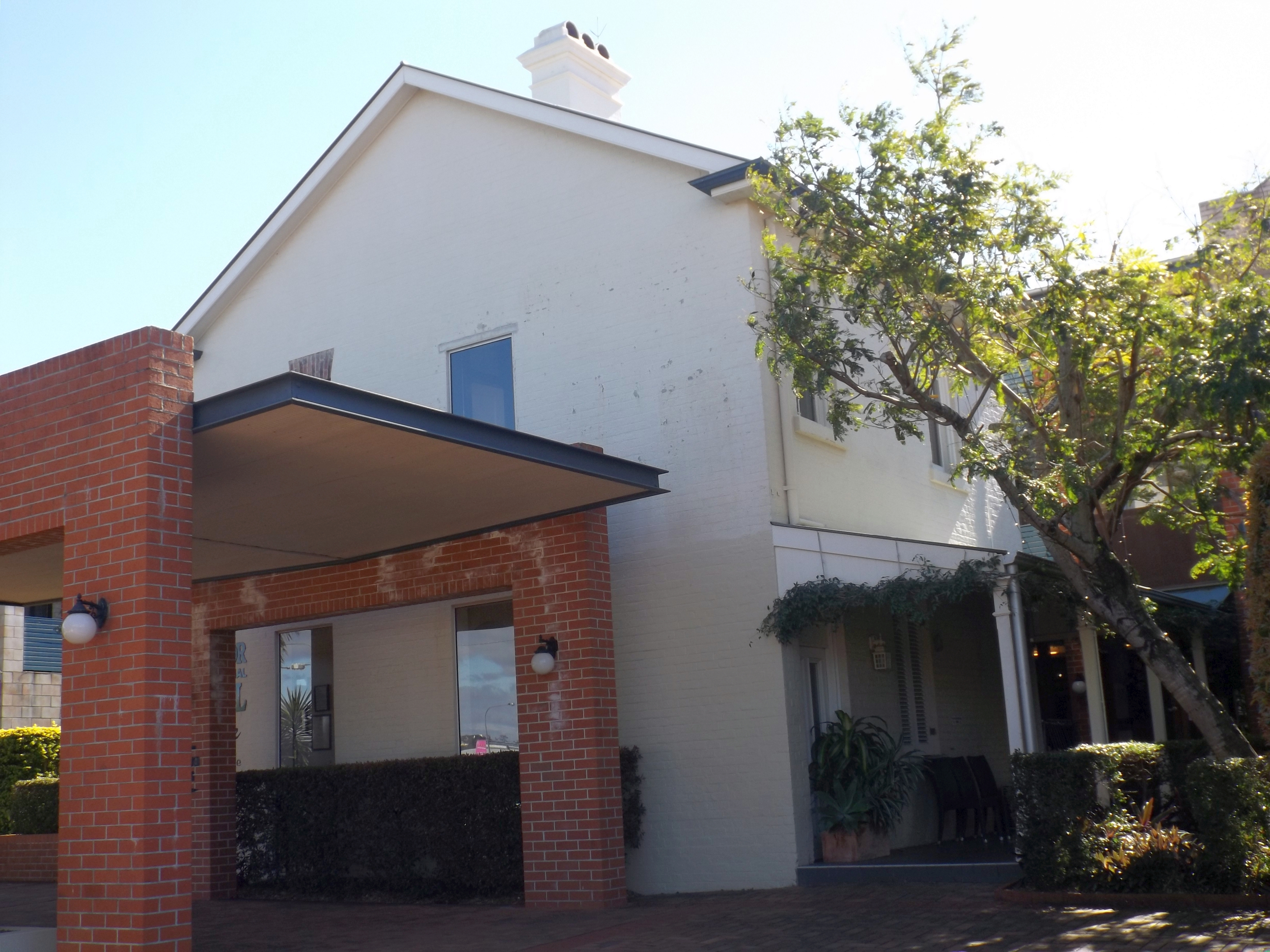
- 2015

- Location within Queensland Location within Australia
- 27.4385°S 153.0316°E
- Location: 16 Bryden Street, Windsor, City of Brisbane, Queensland, Australia

History
- Design period: 1870s–1890s (late 19th century)
- Built: c. 1873–1920s

Queensland Heritage Register
- Official name: Skilmorlie
- Type: state heritage (built)
- Designated: 15 October 1998
- Reference no.: 601830
- Significant period: 1870s (fabric); 1870s–1880s (historical)
- Significant components: residential accommodation – main house, views from

Skilmorlie is a heritage-listed detached house at 16 Bryden Street, Windsor, City of Brisbane, Queensland, Australia. It was built from c. 1873 to 1920s. It was added to the Queensland Heritage Register on 15 October 1998.

== History ==
Skilmorlie, a small, two-story obrick residence, is believed to have been erected c. 1873 for John Bryden, an Irish immigrant cabinet maker and later property owner who arrived in Brisbane c. 1843. The house is one of the earliest surviving in the Windsor-Lutwyche district.

During the 1850s the land along Breakfast Creek (Enoggera Creek) in the Windsor area was surveyed into farms, but by the end of the decade, most had been alienated by property speculators, and in the 1860s these were sold to Brisbane gentlemen seeking a semi-rural domestic retreat. By 1860 Daniel Rowntree Somerset had built the first section of Rosemount (next to Skilmorlie) and the first Oakwal on the hill opposite, but an important early impetus to Windsor's development was the construction of Bowen Bridge across Breakfast Creek in 1861. In 1864 the Chief Justice of Queensland, Sir James Cockle, commissioned a grand new Oakwal on the site of the old, and in the area west of the main northern road (now Lutwyche Road) and south of what is now Newmarket Road down to Breakfast Creek, merchant David L Brown, colonial architect Charles Tiffin, and newspaper proprietor James Swan took up residence in the 1860s. South of the creek, John Bramston had built his house Herston (which gives its name to the suburb of Herston) in 1861 and further upstream, Ballymore was constructed in 1864 for Lieutenant DJ Seymour. When Skilmorlie and its sister house Fernfield were erected in 1873, there appear to have been two other early residences to the south of them, on the eastern side of Bowen Bridge Road (now Lutwyche Road). Of these mid-19th century Windsor/Herston residences, only Oakwal and the two Bryden homes survive. (The present Rosemount was constructed in the 1890s.) In terms of surviving 1860s/1870s buildings in the Windsor district (and for that matter Brisbane), Skilmorlie and Fernfield are very significant.

In the mid-19th century, the Skilmorlie site was part of a block of just under 21 acres fronting Breakfast Creek to the east and the main northern road to the west, alienated in 1856 by Brisbane businessman George Byrne. In February 1873, surveyor, architect and civil engineer John Hall surveyed the land into three subdivisions, each with a frontage to Bowen Bridge Road. The northernmost allotment (sub 1 : 4 acres 3 roods 11 perches) was transferred to John Bryden in May 1873; the middle allotment (sub 2 : 4 acres 3 roods) was transferred at the same time to Bryden's younger brother James, a successful Brisbane cabinetmaker and upholsterer; and sub 3 (11 acres 1 rood), closest to Bowen Bridge, was retained by the Byrne family. The 1873 survey does not indicate any building extant on subdivisions 1 and 2.

On his Windsor land, James Bryden erected his new residence, Fernfield, designed by architect John Hall, who called tenders in March 1873. The residence was under construction by May 1873, and was to cost £700. Whether Skilmorlie also was designed by Hall is not known, but the materials and brickwork in the two buildings are remarkably similar, which suggests that the two residences were constructed about the same time. The skirting boards in both buildings are of the same profile, and the bricks used in both buildings are a dark reddish-brown, similar to those used in the 1874 Queensland Government Printing Office in William Street. The latter were supplied from William Williams' Lutwyche brickworks, and Williams could well have supplied the bricks for the Bryden residences at nearby Windsor. The Enoggera electoral roll dated 13 January 1875 records both John and James Bryden as resident on Bowen Bridge Road.

The Bryden brothers were the sons of an Irish Protestant cabinetmaker, James Bryden, of Newry, co Down. John, also a cabinetmaker by trade, had arrived in Sydney in March 1841, aged 30 years and single. He was still resident in Sydney in September 1842 when he purchased an allotment at South Brisbane, at an early sale of Brisbane Crown land held in Sydney, but is understood to have moved to Brisbane shortly after. During the 1840s and 1850s John Bryden acquired a number of allotments at north and south Brisbane, and appears to have been associated with contractor John Petrie. He married Susanna Trevethan in Brisbane in 1861, but there were no children from this marriage.

In the mid-1850s, James Bryden, his sister Isabella, and their niece Martha Jane Brennan, emigrated to the Australian colonies. They were in Victoria for about 3 years prior to joining John in Brisbane. By 1863 James had established a cabinetmaking and upholstery business on an allotment on the west side of Queen Street between Creek and Wharf Streets, Brisbane - probably that acquired by John Bryden at a sale of Crown land in 1852.

At Windsor, James and Isabella Bryden and Martha Brennan resided at Fernfield, and James and his wife Susanna lived at Skilmorlie. The two residences stand less than 50 metres (160 ft) apart. A Brennan descendant recorded that one access drive from Bowen Bridge Road serviced both houses, and that Skilmorlie was almost hidden behind trees.

John's wife Susanna died in 1881, and following John's death in 1890, aged 80, title to Skilmorlie passed to trustees. The Brennan family understands that Martha Brennan, who by April 1890 owned Fernfield (James Bryden had died in 1888 and Isabella in 1889), encouraged her brother David, an Irish master mariner, to emigrate to Brisbane with his family about this time, and to make Skilmorlie their home. David Brennan was resident at Bowen Bridge Road in March 1890 when he certified the death of his uncle John Bryden, and is identified in the 1893 Queensland Post Office Directory as resident at Skilmorley house, Bowen Bridge-road. This is the first known recorded reference to the name of the house. From the early 1900s it was spelt Skilmorlie in the directories.

The Brennans occupied Skilmorlie until the early 1920s. In July 1923 title to Skilmorlie, on a reduced site of just over an acre, was transferred from Queensland Trustees to Annabella Catherine Brennan, widow of David Brennan. Almost immediately this property was subdivided into 6 residential allotments - three fronting Lutwyche Road and three fronting Bryden Street, the western end of which was surveyed at this time from Skilmorlie land. Rental houses (occupied by c. 1924) were erected on each of the vacant allotments, and Skilmorlie was converted into flats with a weatherboard extension on the southern end and the western verandahs enclosed so that the house now addresses Bryden Street rather than Lutwyche Road. Skilmorlie stayed within the Brennan family as a rental property until mid-1996.

Subsequently, Skilmorlie was renovated to be the reception and administration centre of the Windsor International Hotel.

== Description ==
Skilmorlie occupies a high block, one allotment east of Lutwyche Road, with extensive views over Windsor, Herston, Fortitude Valley and Bowen Hills. The building fronted Lutwyche Road to the west, but has been extended and now addresses Bryden Street (off Lutwyche Road) to the south.

The building comprises a two-storeyed brick core c. 1873, with a c. 1923 weatherboard extension and verandah enclosures. The brick section is built on a stone (porphyry) base and has a rectangular plan form and a central tripled-flued chimney stack. It has a steeply pitched roof clad with galvanised iron, probably replacing earlier shingles, with the end north and south brick walls each culminating in a gable. Almost all the exterior walls have been painted, but a small uncovered section on the east wall shows the dark reddish-brown facebricks and early tuckpointing. The brickwork is a variation of English bond. All the window openings, with their arched lintels, survive, as do the early sash windows. Verandahs on both levels along the western side of the brick core have been enclosed (c. 1923) with weatherboards and windows. There is evidence on the external east wall of a single-storeyed skillion having been attached to the building at an early stage, but this has been replaced with a c. 1923 weatherboard extension with a less steeply pitched skillion roof.

The internal walls of the c. 1873 section are of brick also. Ceilings are high and are plastered throughout, as are the walls. It is not clear whether early lath and plaster work survives in the ceilings, but the plaster on the walls appears to be mostly original. Floors upstairs and in the two main downstairs rooms are of wide boards. The downstairs front and back verandahs and hallway have early concrete floors resting on a stone (porphyry) base. There are deep timber skirting boards and architraves throughout. The fanlights to the doorways remain, but most of the internal doors, and the timber fireplace surrounds, have been removed.

The brick core comprises two rooms up and two down, with a hallway along the southern end of the ground floor leading from what was originally the front door in the western wall to a small stair hall in the SE corner of the building. There is an original arch between the hallway and the stair hall, and an early back door in the eastern external wall below the staircase. The lack of a central hallway is unusual in a house of this period, suggesting the design was the work of a competent architect who maximised the size and functionality of the rooms by offsetting the hallway.

The western downstairs room opens off the hallway, and the eastern off the stair hall. There is a doorway in the wall between these two rooms, which also have back-to-back fireplaces. The fireplace in the eastern room is much larger than its twin, and it is likely that originally the eastern room was a kitchen with a connecting door to the western room, which was probably a dining room. There is a door in the eastern external wall of the former kitchen, leading to the rear verandah. A door in the north wall of the former kitchen leads to what is now the backyard.

Upstairs, there is no hallway, and both rooms open off the stair landing. The western room is the most spacious in the building and opens onto the upstairs verandah. There is a fireplace in this room, but not in the room behind it.

During the c. 1923 renovations, two additional doors, one on each floor, were cut in the southern end wall of the brick core, giving access to the weatherboard extension. Apart from this modification, the brick core survives substantially intact and sound.

== Heritage listing ==
Skilmorlie was listed on the Queensland Heritage Register on 15 October 1998 having satisfied the following criteria.

The place is important in demonstrating the evolution or pattern of Queensland's history.

Skilmorlie, erected c. 1873, is significant for its close association with the development of Windsor in the mid-19th century as a middle-class suburb, and with the development of nearby Lutwyche as Brisbane's principal brick-making district late 1860s–1890s. It is one of the earliest surviving residences in the Windsor-Lutwyche district, contemporaneous with adjacent Fernfield, and with brick-maker William Williams' own residence (now known as The Grange) at Lutwyche.

The place demonstrates rare, uncommon or endangered aspects of Queensland's cultural heritage.

The two-story house is a rare masonry, gable-styled dwelling, which has survived in Brisbane since the 1870’s. Since buildings of this type are uncommon in Queensland, it offers a valuable contribution to present knowledge of brick construction and design in late nineteenth century Brisbane.

The place has potential to yield information that will contribute to an understanding of Queensland's history.

The potential contribution of this building to further research on 1870s building techniques, materials and design, on the development of early brick-making in Brisbane, and on the evolution of Brisbane's inner northern suburbs, cannot be underestimated.

The place is important in demonstrating the principal characteristics of a particular class of cultural places.

Skilmorlie is significant also as a substantially intact example of a modest but well built, detailed and designed, two-storeyed 1870s brick residence in Brisbane. A few brick, two-story terrace houses and shop houses from the 1860s and 1870s survive in Brisbane, but there are even fewer detached brick residences of this type and period surviving, and large homes such as Glen Lyon (1876) at Ashgrove are of a grander scale than Skilmorlie.

The place is important because of its aesthetic significance.

Despite the c. 1923 renovations, Skilmorlie retains a historical aesthetic quality and significance, retaining much of the scale, form, design and materials of the early brick core. Much of the building’s Georgian stylings remain behind its weatherboard extension and enclosed verandahs.

The place has a strong or special association with a particular community or cultural group for social, cultural or spiritual reasons.

The place is valued by the local community, who regard Skilmorlie, and adjacent Fernfield, as part of the unique heritage of Windsor.

The place has a special association with the life or work of a particular person, group or organisation of importance in Queensland's history.

It is significant for its close association with the Bryden-Brennan families, who occupied the house for 50 years and retained it as a rental property for another 70. In particular, it has a close association with John Bryden, who participated in the first wave of free settlement in Brisbane in the early 1840s.
