= Great Oakley =

Great Oakley may refer to:

- Great Oakley, Essex, England
- Great Oakley, Northamptonshire, England
