= Boothville =

Boothville may refer to the following places:

- Boothville, Louisiana, United States
- Boothville, Northamptonshire, Northamptonshire England
- Boothville, Ontario, a community in Southgate, Canada
- Boothville-Venice, Louisiana, United States
- Boothville House, Former Salvation Army maternity hospital in Brisbane, Queensland, Australia
