= Craigellachie =

Craigellachie may refer to:

- Craigellachie, British Columbia, Canada
- Craigellachie, Moray, Scotland
  - Craigellachie railway station
  - Craigellachie distillery
- Craigellachie, Windsor, a heritage-listed house in Windsor, Brisbane, Queensland, Australia
- Craigellachie National Nature Reserve, a national nature reserve near Aviemore, Scotland
