= Oakwal =

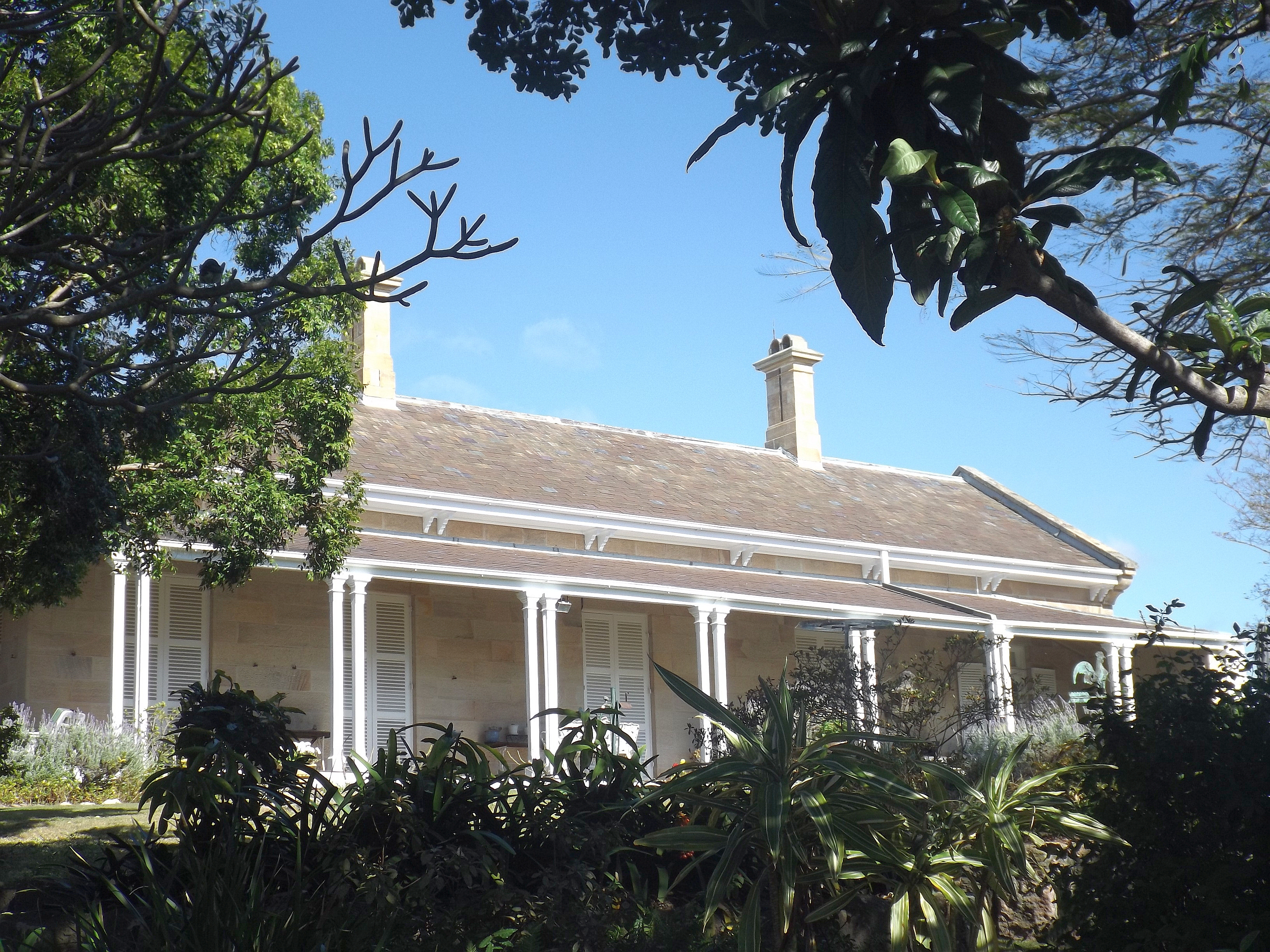
- Residence in 2015

- Location within Queensland Location within Australia
- 27.4368°S 153.0281°E
- Location: 50 Bush Street, Windsor, City of Brisbane, Queensland, Australia

History
- Design period: 1840s–1860s (mid-19th century)
- Built: 1864–c. 1948

Site notes
- Architect: James Cowlishaw

Queensland Heritage Register
- Official name: Oakwal
- Type: state heritage (built, landscape)
- Designated: 14 May 1993
- Reference no.: 600345
- Significant period: 1860s, 1940s (fabric); 1860s–1890s (historical)
- Significant components: kitchen/kitchen house, residential accommodation – main house, garden/grounds
- Builders: John Petrie

Oakwal is a heritage-listed villa at 50 Bush Street, Windsor, City of Brisbane, Queensland, Australia. It was designed by architect James Cowlishaw and built in 1864 by John Petrie with subsequent modifications to c. 1948. It was added to the Queensland Heritage Register on 14 May 1993.

== History ==
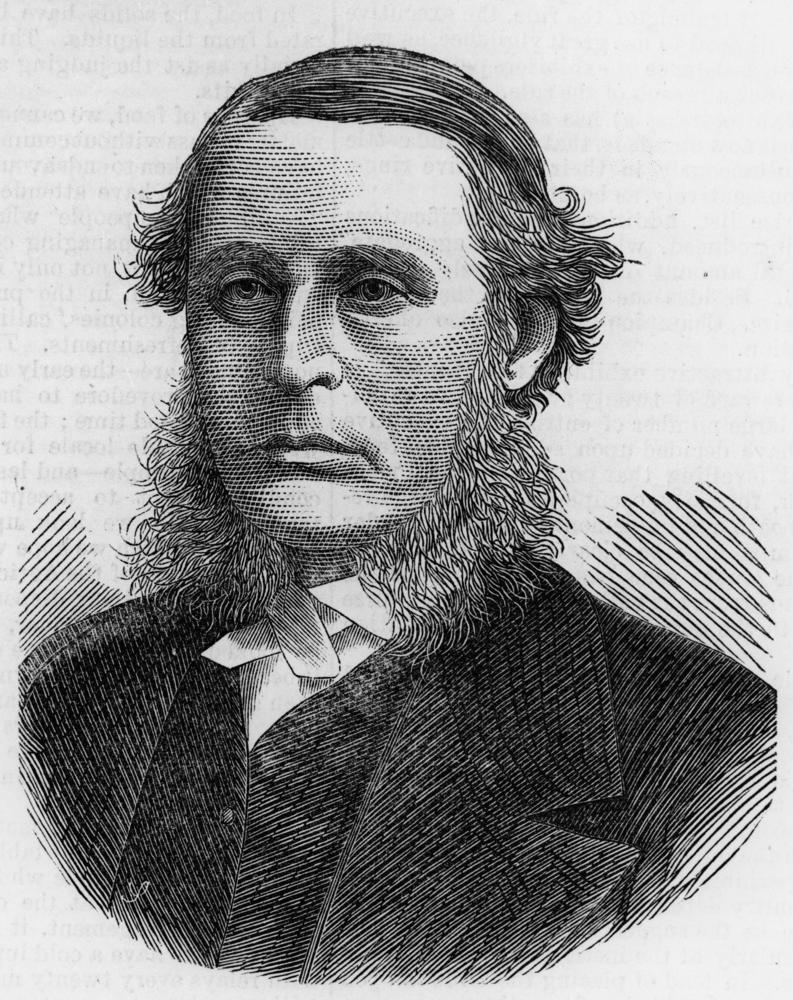
Sir James Cockle, first Chief Justice of Queensland, 1876

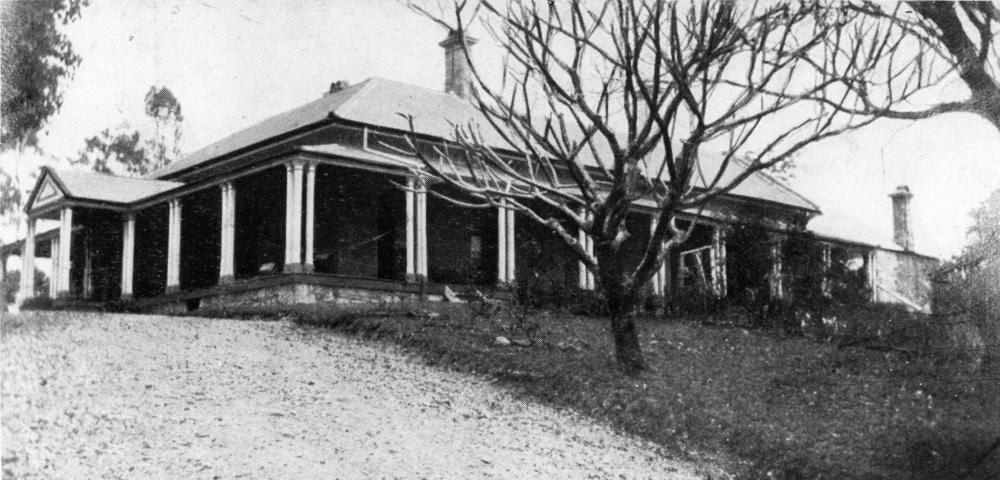
Oakwal, cica 1930

This substantial, single-storeyed stone residence, designed by Brisbane architect James Cowlishaw, was constructed in 1864 by contractor John Petrie for Justice James Cockle, at a cost of approximately £4,000.

Oakwal is thought to be the second residence on the site. An earlier house may have been erected c. 1858-59 for Brisbane businessman Daniel Rountree Somerset, who in May 1858 purchased over 20 hectares (49 acres) of land north of Breakfast Creek, which included the Oakwal site, for a little over £120. Somerset had arrived in Brisbane with his family in 1850–51 and during the 1850s was in partnership with John Richardson in a Brisbane warehousing, shipping agency and customs agency business. He was active in the movement for the separation of Queensland, and in 1860 was appointed Chief Clerk of the Queensland Customs Department and Shipping Master for the Port of Brisbane.

By 1858 the Somersets were resident at Rosemount on Breakfast Creek. In December 1858 they advertised Rosemount and several other Brisbane allotments for sale. Descendants believe that the Somersets left Rosemount in April 1859, and that they lived at a residence on the later Oakwal site before selling it on nearly 16.2 hectares (40 acres) to James Cockle in 1863, for £1,000.

Cockle was Chief Justice of Queensland from 1863 to 1879, and as senior commissioner in 1866–67 he consolidated many of Queensland's earliest statutes. He was knighted in 1869. The Cockles commissioned prominent Brisbane architect James Cowlishaw to design their new residence, which they named Oakwal. It is believed they derived the name from Cockle's birthplace at Great Oakley in Essex and his wife's birthplace of Walton in Suffolk.

The Cockles resided at Oakwal for 15 years, during which time Lady Cockle held an annual picnic for local school children in the substantial grounds. When Cockle left the colony in mid-1878 he rented out the house at £250 per annum. The most distinguished of his lessees was Sir Arthur Palmer, Queensland Premier from 1870–74, and later acting Queensland Governor in 1883 and 1888–89, who resided at Oakwal in the 1880s. Palmer remained in residence until 1890, despite the property having been sold to the original designer - architect, politician and newspaper proprietor James Cowlishaw - in 1888. A July 1888 newspaper report suggested that the house and lands exchanged hands for around £10,000.

Cowlishaw subdivided and sold off much of the Oakwal estate, but his relatives and their descendants have occupied the house since 1890. In the late 1940s a two-storeyed sandstone kitchen wing was demolished to enable the present land subdivision and the creation of Bush Street. The timber extension was added at this time. Sandstone blocks from the demolished service wing were utilised in the landscaping of the remaining grounds.

== Description ==
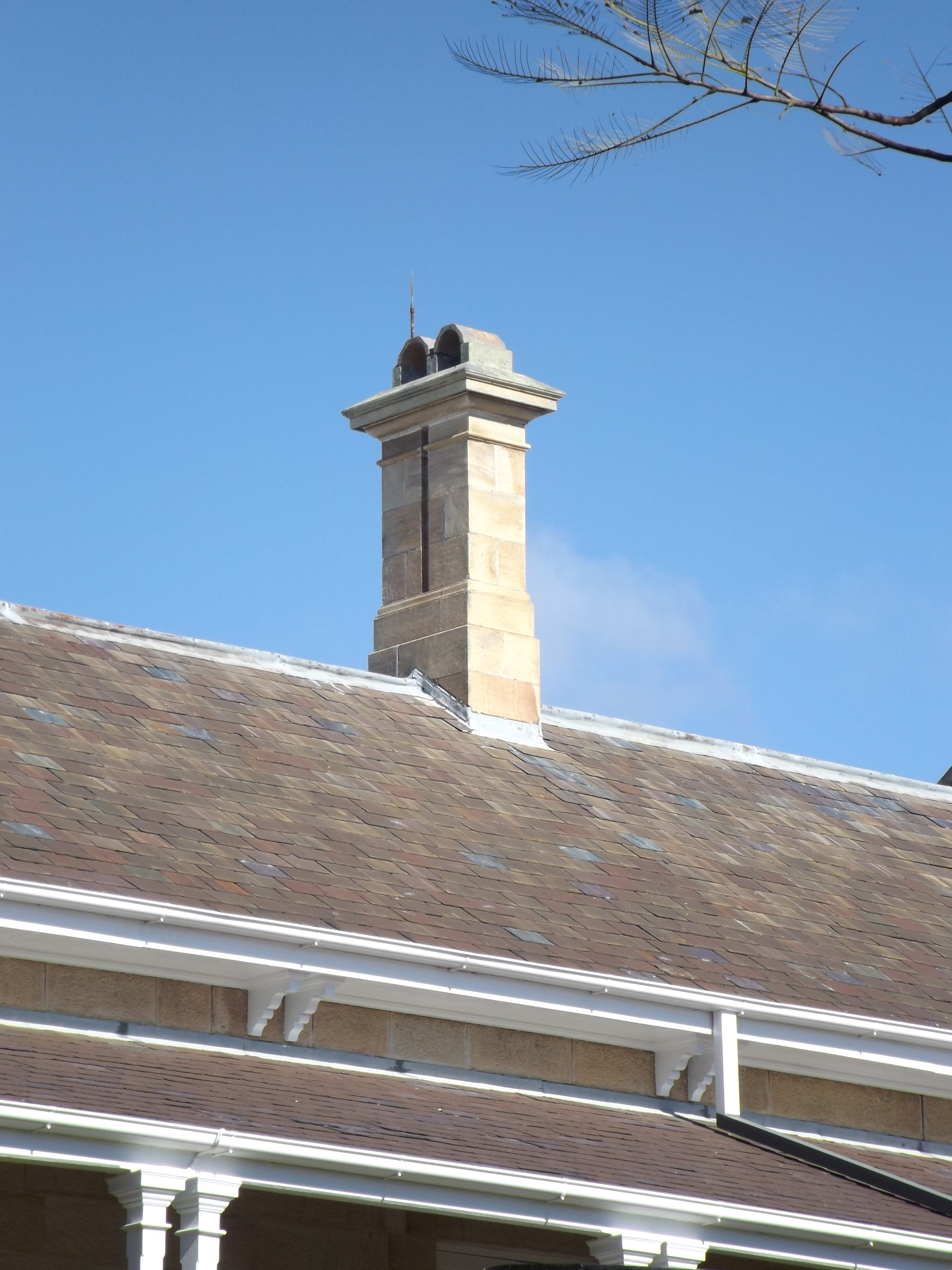
Rooftop, 2015

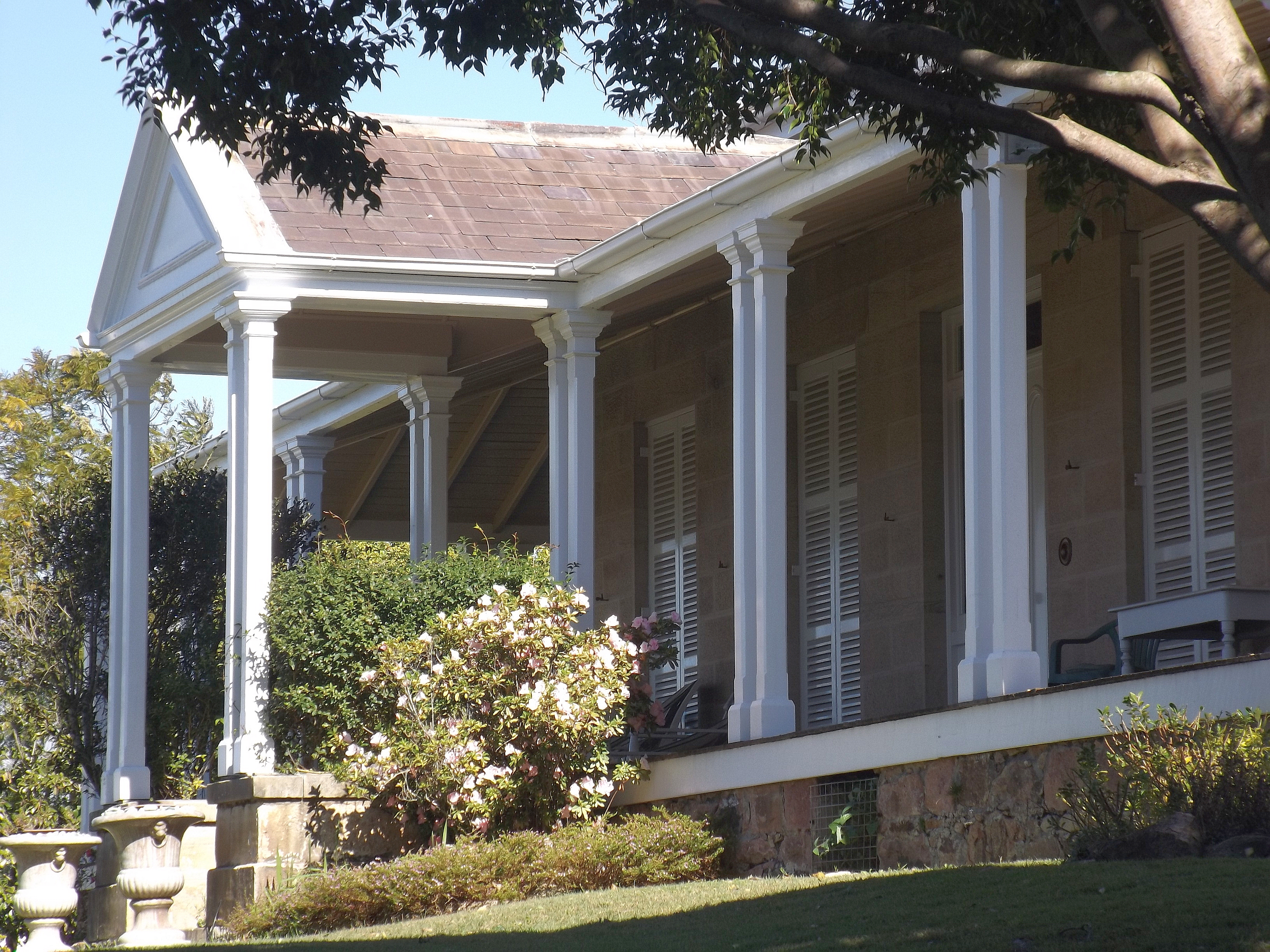
Entrance, 2015

Oakwal, a single-storeyed sandstone residence on the crest of a hill just north of Breakfast Creek at Windsor, is encircled by Bush Street. The building exhibits a Georgian influence in its design, such as the symmetrical east elevation with portico, hammered stone walls, paired square timber verandah posts and louvred shutters to French doors.

The building has a slate U-shaped gabled roof with four sandstone chimneys, western gabled parapets, a central box gutter and lower skillion roof verandahs to the south, east and north with paired timber eave brackets. The entrance portico has a timber pediment with sandstone steps and base. Most of the south verandah has been enclosed for bathrooms and studies, and has a weatherboard base, shuttered casement windows and panel infill. The main entrance has double timber doors with fanlight and sidelights, and shuttered, arched French doors with fanlights open onto the verandahs. A gabled wing with a corrugated iron roof has been added to the west. This timber addition has casement windows, a stone base and contains bathrooms, laundry and an office. A stone and weatherboard garage with a gabled roof of corrugated iron has been added to the northwest, sitting lower than the house and almost to the site boundary.

The floorplan consists of rooms opening off a central hallway with archways and a central domed skylight with a light shaft above. Internally, the building has cedar panelled doors with fanlights, architraves and skirtings, rendered masonry walls, plaster ceilings with decorative roses and timber floors with floor coverings. All principal rooms have fireplaces, of which only the front two rooms operate and have marble surrounds. The northwest room has been refitted as the kitchen. The west addition has single-skin tongue and groove walls.

== Heritage listing ==
Oakwal was listed on the Queensland Heritage Register on 14 May 1993 having satisfied the following criteria.

The place is important in demonstrating the evolution or pattern of Queensland's history.

Oakwal, erected in 1864, is one of the earliest villa residences established on the hills between Breakfast Creek and Kedron Brook in the mid-19th century, and is important in demonstrating the pattern of settlement and growth of Brisbane's northern suburbs.

The place demonstrates rare, uncommon or endangered aspects of Queensland's cultural heritage.

The 1860s sandstone and slate residence is significant for its aesthetic quality, craftsmanship and intactness, including the internal cedar joinery, skylight, plaster ceiling roses, stonework and original beech floors, and remains a rare example of its type in Brisbane.

The place is important in demonstrating the principal characteristics of a particular class of cultural places.

The 1860s sandstone and slate residence is significant for its aesthetic quality, craftsmanship and intactness, including the internal cedar joinery, skylight, plaster ceiling roses, stonework and original beech floors, and remains a rare example of its type in Brisbane.

Oakwal is a fine example of the domestic work of prominent Brisbane architect James Cowlishaw, and has a special association with the Cockle, Palmer and Cowlishaw families - important judicial, political and social figures in 19th century Queensland.

The place is important because of its aesthetic significance.

The 1860s sandstone and slate residence is significant for its aesthetic quality, craftsmanship and intactness, including the internal cedar joinery, skylight, plaster ceiling roses, stonework and original beech floors, and remains a rare example of its type in Brisbane. The house and grounds are significant also for their landmark quality and townscape contribution.

The place has a special association with the life or work of a particular person, group or organisation of importance in Queensland's history.

Oakwal is a fine example of the domestic work of prominent Brisbane architect James Cowlishaw, and has a special association with the Cockle, Palmer and Cowlishaw families - important judicial, political and social figures in 19th century Queensland.
