= The Grange, Windsor =

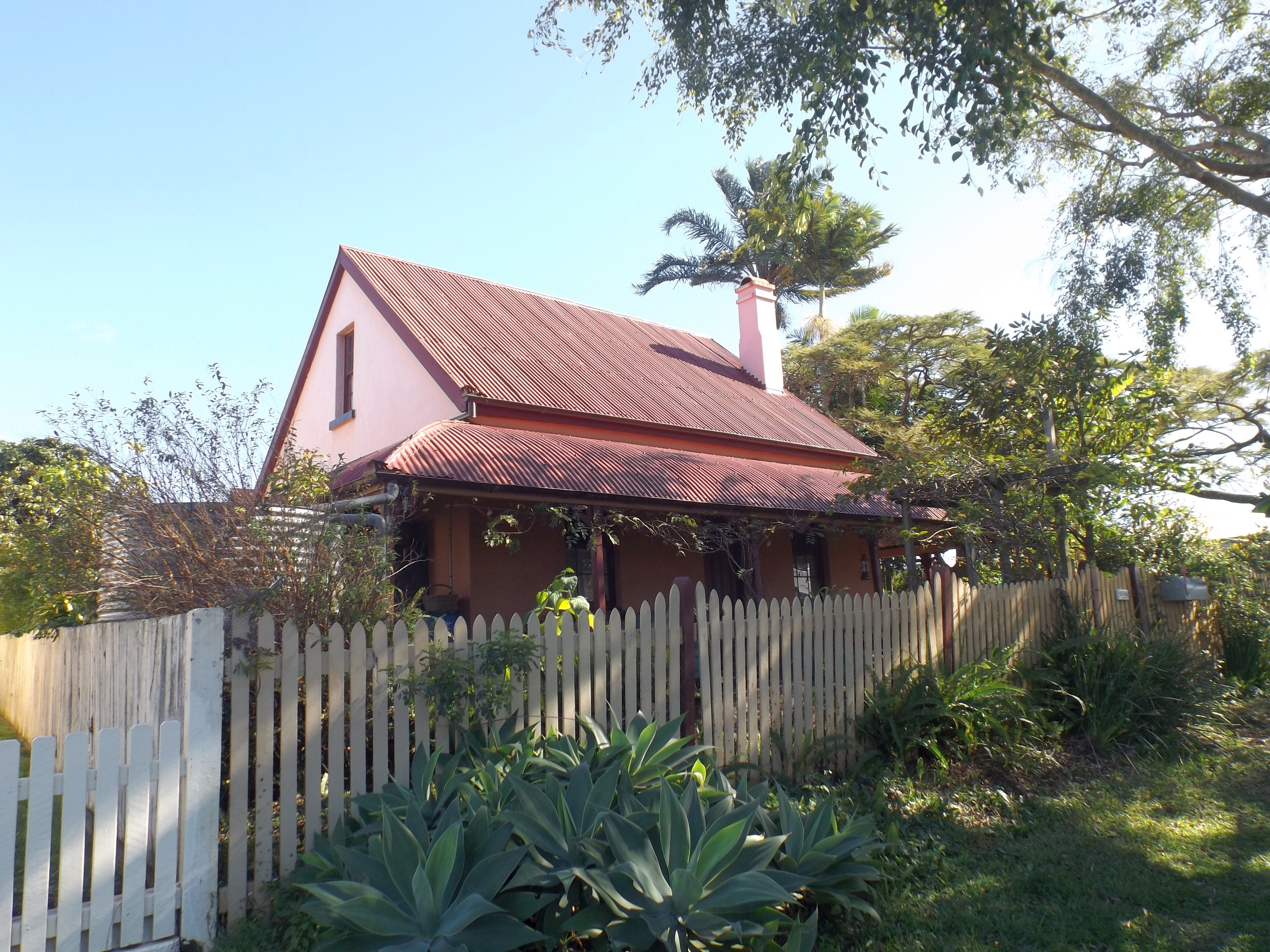
- Residence in 2015

- Location within Queensland Location within Australia
- 27.4249°S 153.0265°E
- Location: 38 Crowther Street, Windsor, City of Brisbane, Queensland, Australia

History
- Design period: 1870s–1890s (late 19th century)
- Built: c. 1874–1877

Queensland Heritage Register
- Official name: The Grange
- Type: state heritage (built)
- Designated: 21 October 1992
- Reference no.: 600347
- Significant period: 1870s (fabric); 1870s–1890s (historical)
- Significant components: residential accommodation – main house, attic, kitchen/kitchen house

The Grange is a heritage-listed detached house at 38 Crowther Street, Windsor, City of Brisbane, Queensland, Australia. It was built from c. 1874 to 1877. It was added to the Queensland Heritage Register on 21 October 1992.

== History ==
This small brick house appears to have been constructed c. 1874 as a family home for Lutwyche brickmaker William Williams, who in that year acquired 9 hectares of land at Lutwyche, including the house site, from Brisbane businessman Nehemiah Bartley. The kitchen was erected in 1877 by contractor John William Young for £69/10/-, being labour only.

Williams was associated with the development of Lutwyche as Brisbane's principal brickmaking district in the 1870s and 1880s, and it is likely that the bricks for his own house and kitchen were supplied from the brickworks on his Lutwyche property. Although Williams had arrived in Queensland from England by early 1864 and was at Lutwyche in 1865, he does not appear to have commenced brickmaking until the 1870s. Some of the first bricks produced by him were used in construction of the Old Government Printery), erected in 1874. By 1888 Williams owned four brickyards, including the Milton Brickworks on River Road at Toowong, and was producing the highest per annum output of bricks in the Lutwyche area. Mrs Williams managed the business from c. 1882, and Williams and his son William, worked two of the brickyards themselves.

Following Williams' death in the early 1890s, the freehold passed to his widow, who sold the house in 1904. The land has been subdivided since, but the house remains a family home.

Fullers Street at Lutwyche was originally named Williams Street, after the early brickmaker and his family, and nearby Brickfield Street recalls the brickmaking enterprise which Williams established at Lutwyche in the 1870s.

== Description ==
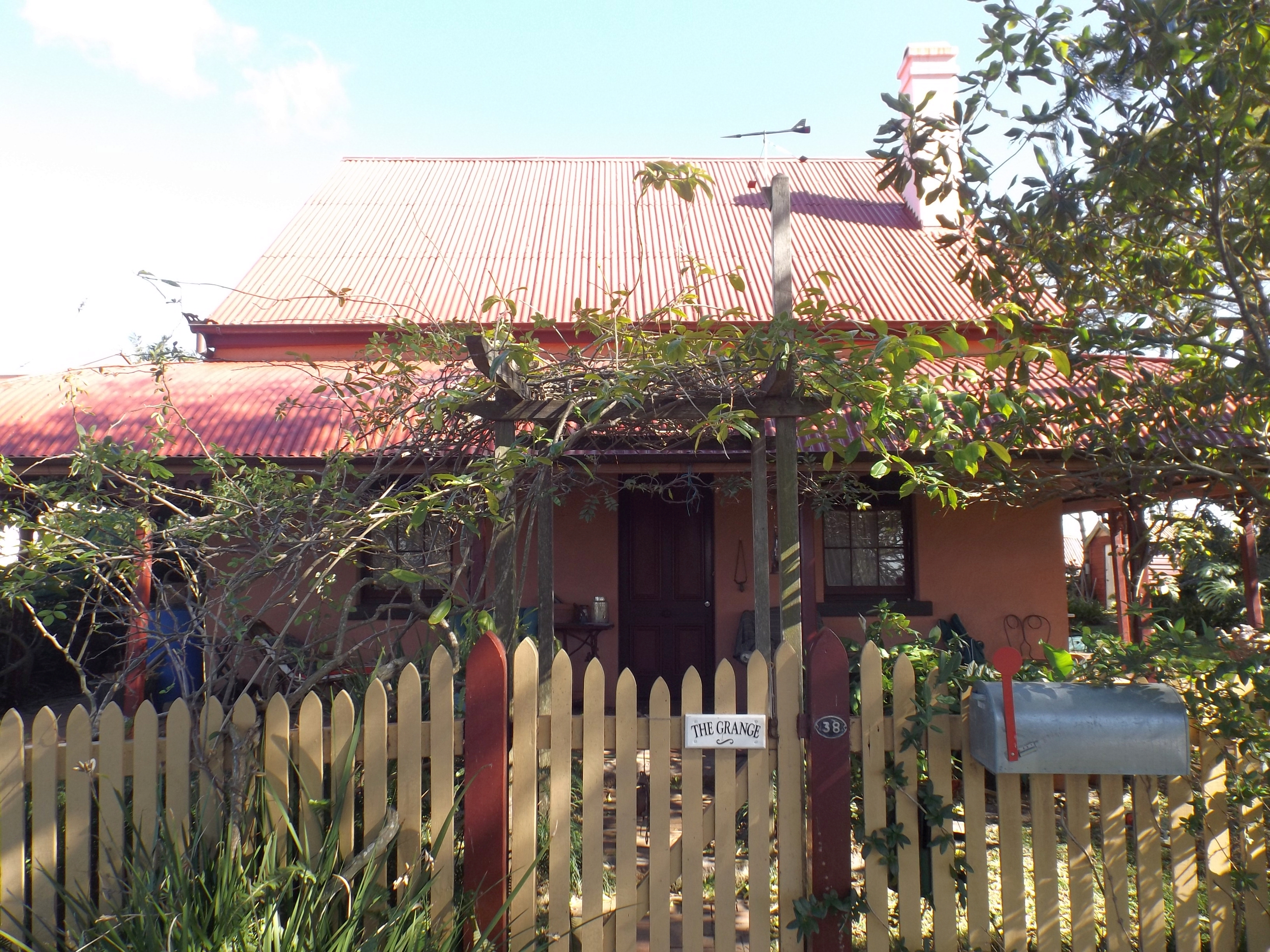
Entrance, 2015

The Grange, located on the crest of a rise at the southwest corner of Crowther and Fuller streets, consists of a residence fronting Crowther Street to the east with a detached kitchen house to the west.

The residence is a single-storeyed rendered masonry structure with an attic and corrugated iron gable roof. The building has verandahs to four sides with curved corrugated iron awnings, timber posts with shaped brackets and brick paving. Timber sash windows have been built to match early windows in the kitchen house, and timber front and rear doors are later additions.

Internally, the building has four rooms with fireplaces to both north rooms and a central entry to the east and west. The northeast room has cedar cupboards either side of the fireplace and the northwest room has an early timber staircase to the attic. The floor consists of a recent 20-millimetre (0.79 in) concrete slab laid over sand on a bed of original brick bats. Walls are lime plastered with horse hair, and have original concrete skirting. Internal timber doors are not original. The attic has a recent ensuite at the north end, and a single Velux roof window has been inserted on the southwestern side.

The kitchen house is a single-storeyed masonry structure, partly rendered, with a corrugated iron gable roof. The building has a verandah to the west with a corrugated iron awning, timber posts and brick paving, and early timber doors and sash windows.

Internally, the building is a single room with a fireplace at the north end, a recent timber floor and limewash finish to the walls. A single Velux roof window has been inserted on the eastern side.

A weatherboard boathouse/living area with a corrugated iron gable roof has been added to the northwest of the kitchen house, and a later weatherboard bunkhouse with a hipped corrugated iron roof has been added to the southwest.

A timber pigeon coop is located in the northwest corner of the site, and a timber picket fence surrounds the eastern side of the residence.

== Heritage listing ==
The Grange was listed on the Queensland Heritage Register on 21 October 1992 having satisfied the following criteria.

The place is important in demonstrating the evolution or pattern of Queensland's history.

The Grange is important in demonstrating the 19th century development of Windsor-Lutwyche as a brick-making district, and is significant as a rare surviving brick, gable-style artisan's home of the 1870s, which offers rare surviving evidence of 1870s brick construction in Brisbane.

The place demonstrates rare, uncommon or endangered aspects of Queensland's cultural heritage.

The Grange is important in demonstrating the 19th century development of Windsor-Lutwyche as a brick-making district, and is significant as a rare surviving brick, gable-style artisan's home of the 1870s, which offers rare surviving evidence of 1870s brick construction in Brisbane.

The place is important in demonstrating the principal characteristics of a particular class of cultural places.

The Grange is important in demonstrating the 19th century development of Windsor-Lutwyche as a brick-making district, and is significant as a rare surviving brick, gable-style artisan's home of the 1870s, which offers rare surviving evidence of 1870s brick construction in Brisbane.

The place is important because of its aesthetic significance.

It exhibits a range of aesthetic characteristics, including the contribution through scale, form and materials to the local streetscape and Windsor townscape; the quality of the interiors, including early fittings and finishes; and the spatial relationship of the building group and grounds, including later additions.

The place has a special association with the life or work of a particular person, group or organisation of importance in Queensland's history.

The place has a special association with the Williams family and their contribution to the development of the brick-making industry in the Windsor-Lutwyche area.
