= Bess Street Brick Cottages =

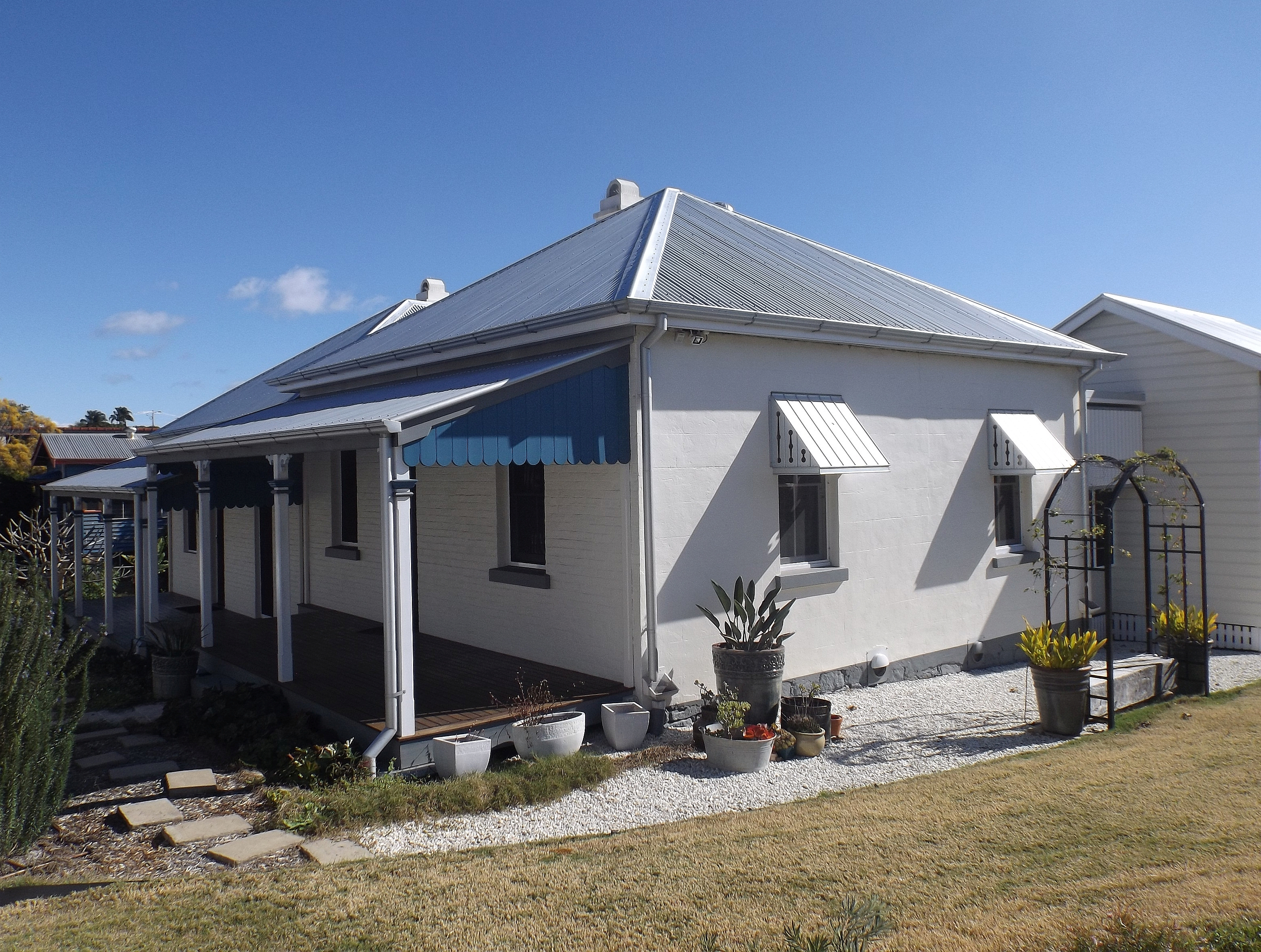
- Cottages in 2015

- Location within Queensland Location within Australia
- 27.4259°S 153.0297°E
- Location: 22, 25–27 Bess Street, Windsor, City of Brisbane, Queensland, Australia

History
- Design period: 1870s–1890s (late 19th century)
- Built: c. 1880 – 1930s circa

Queensland Heritage Register
- Official name: Bess Street Brick Cottages, Hedge's Buildings
- Type: state heritage (built)
- Designated: 15 December 2000
- Reference no.: 601834
- Significant period: 1880s–1930s (fabric); 1880s (historical)
- Significant components: residential accommodation – maisonette/s / duplex, kitchen/kitchen house, residential accommodation – main house

Bess Street Brick Cottages, also known as Hedge's Buildings, is a heritage-listed duplex at 22, 25–27 Bess Street, Windsor, City of Brisbane, Queensland, Australia. It was built from c. 1880 to c. 1930s. It was added to the Queensland Heritage Register on 15 December 2000.

== History ==
These small brick cottages were erected in the late 1870s or early 1880s, most likely by or for Samuel Hedge, a Lutwyche brickyard proprietor.

The Lutwyche district was first surveyed in 1858 as farm portions, several of which were alienated by Sarah Sophia Bartley, wife of Nehemiah Bartley, in 1859. In 1865 part of the Bartley's land was subdivided. In October 1870, the title to 4 acres (1.6 ha) (subdivisions 29A & 32 of portions 189 & 190, parish of Enoggera), passed to Samuel Hedge of Enoggera.

Samuel Hedge and Son were brickmakers at Lutwyche from at least 1878 (likely much earlier) until the early 1890s. The son referred to was Francis John Hedge, and by 1889 they had been joined in the business by Samuel Hedge Jr. Samuel Hedge Sr. appears to have retired from brickmaking c. 1890. He resided in Bess Street during the 1880s, and returned there c. 1900, prior to his death in 1903. FJ Hedge continued as a brickmaker into the early 1890s, but by 1896 Francis John Hedge and Samuel Hedge (junior?) were farming at West Haldon, south of Gatton.

It is not clear whether Samuel Hedge's brickyard was located on the land he acquired in 1870. Being resident in the Enoggera district already, he may have established a brickyard elsewhere, or have been leasing from the Bartleys prior to purchase. The Windsor and Districts Historical Society suggests that Hedge's brickyards extended from Bess Street to Fuller Street and north to Kedron Brook.

Brickmaking was one of the earliest manufacturing enterprises in Brisbane, and in the 1870s and 1880s was concentrated principally in the Lutwyche-Kedron district (which then included parts of Windsor). Well-known Lutwyche brickmakers of this period included William Anderson, Samuel Hedge and Son, John Salt, George and Charles Starkey, and William Williams. Fuller Street at Lutwyche was originally named William Street, possibly after early brickmaker William Williams, and nearby Brickfield Street recalls the brickmaking enterprise which Williams established at Lutwyche in the 1870s.

In August 1877 Hedge subdivided the 4 acres (1.6 ha) acquired in 1870, into 20 residential allotments and a dead-end street off Brook Street, variously known as Best or Bess Street in the early years. Later, Bess Street was extended east to meet McKenzie Street. The blocks at each end of Bess Street averaged close to 1 rood (11,000 sq ft; 1,000 m^{2}) each in size; those in-between were surveyed as 27 perches (680 m^{2}) each on the north side of the road and 23.4 perches (590 m^{2}) each on the south side. The survey plan does not indicate any extant dwellings, but shows a perimeter fence around the 4-acre (1.6 ha) property.

Samuel Hedge sold the bulk of the re-subdivisions between 1878 and 1886, but retained title to 20 Bess Street (resub 9) and 25–27 Bess Street (resubs 13–14) until 1899. He also retained title to the block on the southern corner of Bess and Brook streets, which contained a duplex similar in form to what is now 20 Bess Street, but fronting Brook Street. This building is no longer extant.

As there was not yet a railway in the district, and nearby Lutwyche village was scarcely developed at this period, it appears that Hedge subdivided the land to service workers in his and other nearby brickyards. By 1885, the residents of Bess Street were mostly working class, many associated with brickmaking, and included:

- Frederick C Butler, drayman (FC Butler acquired re-subdivisions 3 and 4 in 1879 and 1881 respectively)
- Charles Hawkwood, busdriver and George Perkins, brickmaker, both of whom lived in Edges Buildings (this is likely Hedges Buildings, and may refer either to what is now 20 Bess Street, or to 25–27 Bess Street)
- John Hopkinson, gardener; James Morgan, brickmaker (Bridget Morgan acquired resubdivision 2 in 1882)
- Mary Saxby
- Joseph Sibthorpe, drayman (Samuel Hedge's daughter Caroline married Joseph Sibthorpe in 1876 and in 1884 acquired title to re-subdivisions 15 and 16)
- Edward Usher, brickmaker.

By 1887, James Watterson, carpenter, also resided in the street (Watterson acquired re-subdivisions 5–7 in 1886). Samuel Hedge is listed as resident in Bess Street by 1888. In 1890, the residents of Bess Street were mostly owner-occupiers:

- D Good, broker
- J Morgan, brickmaker
- S Hedge, snr
- S Hedge, jnr, brickmaker
- Mrs C Sibthorpe
- Mrs MA Saxby
- FC Bulter, drayman
- J Waterson (sic), joiner

In 1998, both 22 and 25–27 Bess Street, Windsor were identified as places of heritage significance in the Grange District Heritage and Character Study prepared by the Brisbane City Council's Heritage Unit.

=== 22 Bess Street ===
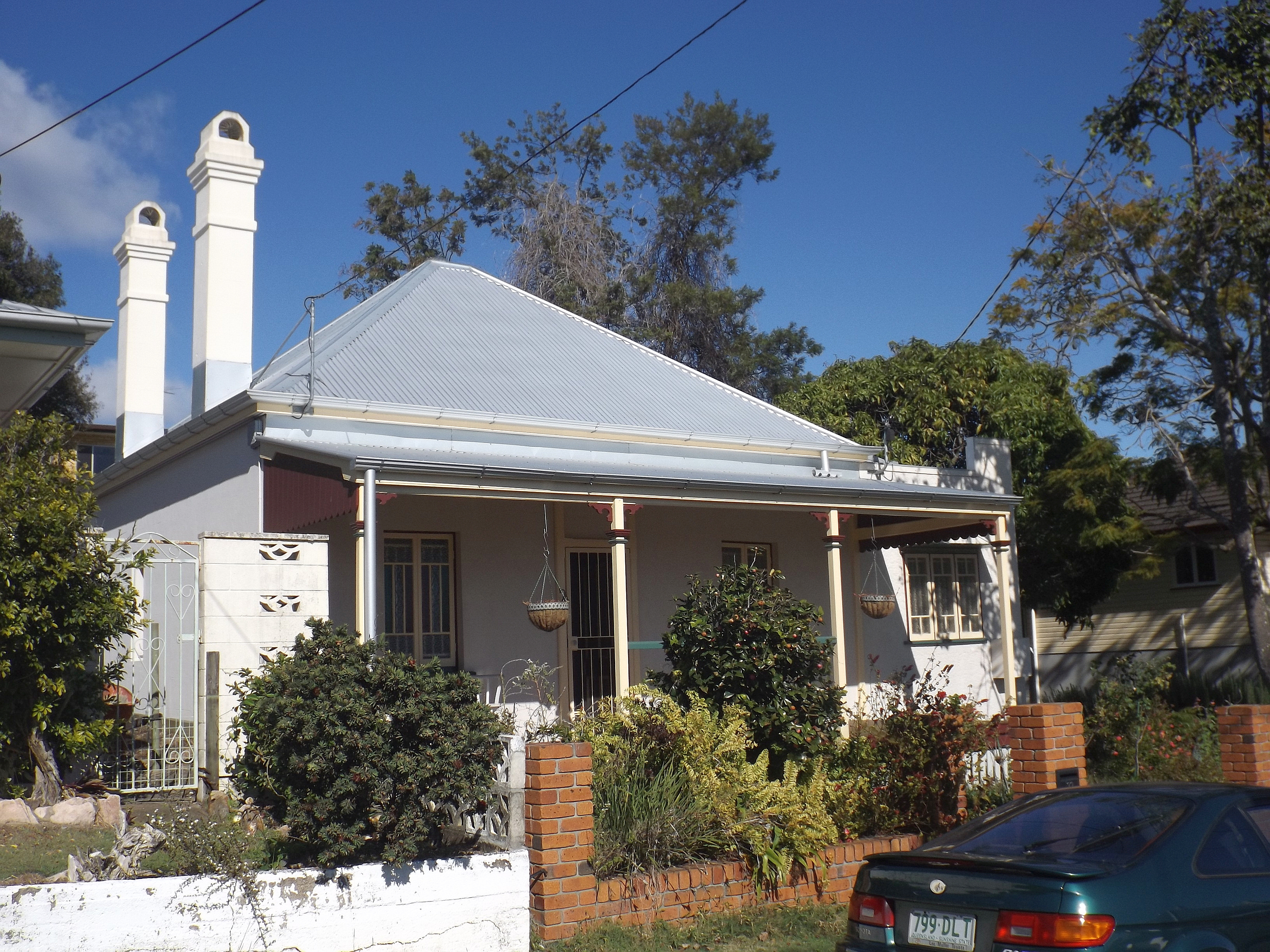
22 Bess Street in 2015

Re-subdivision 8 (22 Bess Street) was transferred from Hedge to Henry Day in November 1881. The brick cottage on this property is built to the eastern boundary, suggesting that it also was built after the 1877 re-subdivision. The position of the house and the internal chimneys along the eastern wall suggests also that it was Hedge who erected the building, intending to construct a duplex similar to 25–27 Bess Street across the road, but that before this was accomplished, he sold the property to Day. Henry Day is listed as a Lutwyche butcher and blacksmith in the 1878–79 Post Office Directory, but does not appear in the district again until 1891, when he is recorded as H Day, builder, resident in Bess St. However, by this time title to 22 Bess Street had been transferred in 1889 from Day to Walter Henry Qualtrough. The property remained in the Qualtrough family, apparently as a rental investment, for about 3 decades, until transferred to Janet Watters, widow, of Brisbane, in August 1920. Mrs Watters resided at 22 Bess Street through the 1920s, until her death in 1931. It would appear that she was responsible for the refurbishment of the cottage, with the construction of a western sleeping verandah and bathroom, and decorative plasterwork throughout.

=== 25–27 Bess Street ===
Samuel Hedge retained title to 25–27 Bess Street until it was transferred in May 1899 to his daughter Caroline Aspinall (formerly Caroline Sibthorpe), who had married George Valentine Aspinall in New South Wales in 1895. The Aspinalls did not reside in Bess Street, but Mrs Aspinall retained 25–27 Bess Street as a rental property until her death in 1935. In 1944 Queensland Trustees transferred title to Sophia Mitchell Henzell, widow, who also appears to have bought the place as a rental investment. Through most of the 1920s and 1930s, 27 Bess Street was tenanted by Michael J O'Connor. The Richard Imrie family rented 25 Bess Street from c. 1919 until 1950, when Richard and Ethel Imrie purchased 25–27 Bess Street as joint tenants with Herbert and Irene Perry, who by then occupied 27 Bess Street. The two families were related. Ethel was Herbert's mother. The Perrys gained Council approved for additions and alterations to 27 Bess Street, including the enclosing of the front verandah, in March 1955, and in 1962 approval was given for the construction of a garage. In 1984, title to 25–27 Bess Street passed to Gregory John Perry. After Heritage listing in 2000 made maintenance and renovation of the property more expensive and difficult, Gregory subsequently sold the property to Ann Schinkel on 22 Dec 2009. The original land title deed is on loan and display at the law offices of Robert Downey Lawyers, Racecourse Rd, Hamilton.

== Description ==
The Bess Street Cottages are located on opposite sides of the eastern end of Bess Street, Windsor. 25–27 Bess Street, on the north side of the street and facing south, is a duplex – two c. 1880 brick cottages sharing a party wall along the boundary between lots 13 & 14 on RP 19286, parish of Enoggera. Diagonally opposite 25 Bess Street, on the southern side of the street and facing north, is 22 Bess Street, a c. 1880 brick cottage with a c. 1920s timber and fibrous-cement extension on the western side. To the east of 22 Bess Street is 20 Bess Street, a brick cottage of similar vintage but different form. This originally was a duplex, but has been substantially modified and converted into a single residence. This building is not included in the heritage listing. All the cottages are built close to the street, with narrow front yards.

=== 22 Bess Street ===
This is a small, 4-roomed brick cottage with later extensions and a c. 1920s refurbishment. The brick core rests on stone foundations and has a short-ridged iron roof with close eaves. There is a recent front verandah which replaces an earlier front verandah, which possibly did not extend across the extension on the western side. The external brick walls are rendered to resemble ashlar. Along the east wall, which is built to the property line, are two chimneys, both of which are constructed internally, suggesting that the original intention may have been to create a duplex as at 25–27 Bess Street, with the party wall along the property line. At the rear, a late 20th century extension containing kitchen and dining room replaces an earlier back verandah and kitchen house. On the western side of the cottage is a c. 1920s sleeping verandah, timber-framed with fibrous cement sheeting externally, clad with a pebble-dash render. The western extension has a geometrically patterned parapet (vaguely Art Deco in inspiration) and several sets of casement windows. It is high set, as the ground slopes slightly to the west, but the rendered front and side walls extend almost to ground level.

Internally, the house retains its original layout, with the c. 1920s extension and later rear additions clearly evident. The early core comprises four rooms. The front door opens directly into the parlour, off which, to the right, is the front bedroom. A door from the parlour leads into the former dining room, off which, to the right, is the second bedroom. The parlour and dining room each have a fireplace in the east wall. The parlour has one window opening onto the front verandah, with c. 1920s casements replacing earlier sashes. The dining room window in the rear wall has been bricked in and two small windows, one either side of the chimney in that room, appear to date from the c. 1920s refurbishment. French doors, possibly replacing earlier double-sash windows, open from both bedrooms onto the c. 1920s sleeping verandah on the western side of the house. At the southern end of the c. 1920s extension is a bathroom. Most of this has been modernised, but a section of c. 1920s terrazzo flooring remains.

The internal walls of the brick core are plastered and the rooms have highly decorative c. 1920s plaster ceilings, ceiling panels and cornices. It is understood that the ceilings were timber-boarded originally, and that these boards survive above the plaster. Flooring throughout is of timber. That in the parlour and dining room is later, narrow hardwood boards, but the front bedroom has earlier wide boards, possibly pine.

=== 25–27 Bess Street ===
25–27 Bess Street is a brick duplex, each house similar in form to 22 Bess Street across the road. Each has the same 4-roomed core resting on a stone foundation, and has a short-ridged iron roof with close eaves – although in these instances, the ridges run front to back rather than side to side. Each has an enclosed front verandah (not identical) and both have formerly detached timber kitchen houses (which may be of later date than the core) and an enclosed rear verandah and rear verandah extensions. These have evolved idiosyncratically. The side external walls are rendered, but the original front and rear external walls of both cottages are of face brickwork, now painted.

Other than in the positioning of the kitchen houses, the cottages are not mirrored in plan, as might be expected, but are replicated.

Internally, both cottages have plastered walls and mostly early timber flooring, although the dining room of 27 Bess Street has a later concrete floor, apparently laid on top of the timber floor. Both cottages have the same varying floor levels: in each there is a step down from front parlour to dining room, then another step down from the dining room to the rear enclosed verandah. The ceilings in most rooms of both cottages are of later fibrous cement sheeting and timber cover strips, possibly covering earlier timber boards. The second bedroom in 27 Bess Street has its original wide, beaded, tongue-and-groove ceiling boards. Each cottage has a fireplace in the dining room, but the chimneys have been removed.

== Heritage listing ==
Bess Street Brick Cottages was listed on the Queensland Heritage Register on 15 December 2000 having satisfied the following criteria.

The place is important in demonstrating the evolution or pattern of Queensland's history.

The Bess Street Brick Cottages, Windsor, erected c. 1880, are important evidence of the development of Kedron/Lutwyche/Windsor as Brisbane's principal brickmaking district in the 1870s and 1880s. Likely erected by brickmaker Samuel Hedge on land he owned and subdivided in the late 1870s, and occupied by brickmakers and others associated with the brickmaking industry, these cottages have a close association with this important early manufacturing industry in Brisbane.

The place demonstrates rare, uncommon or endangered aspects of Queensland's cultural heritage.

The cottages form an historically and spatially cohesive grouping of rare surviving, working class, 19th century brick cottages in Queensland.

25–27 Bess Street is significant in addition as a rare, single-storeyed, c. 1880 brick duplex, there being only a few of this type of dwelling extant in Brisbane.

The place is important in demonstrating the principal characteristics of a particular class of cultural places.

22 and 25–27 Bess Street remain substantially intact and are important in demonstrating the principal characteristics of their type.

The place is important because of its aesthetic significance.

22 Bess Street makes an aesthetic contribution to the streetscape, and 25–27 Bess Street has the potential to do so. The c. 1920s Art Deco-inspired internal renovation of 22 Bess Street has strong aesthetic value, the plaster work being an excellent example of its type.
