= Sir Leslie Wilson Youth Detention Centre =

Former youth detention centre in Queensland, Australia

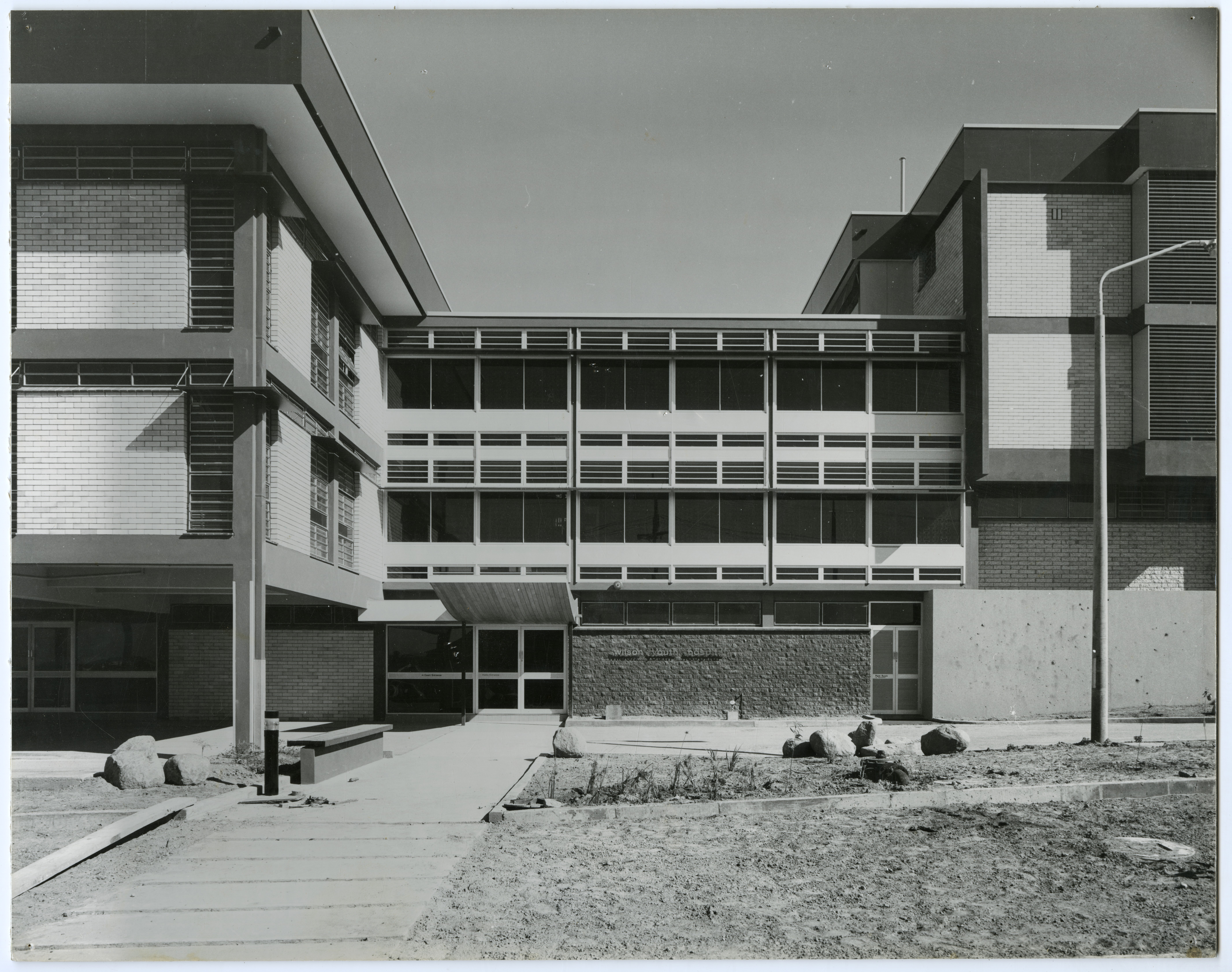
Wilson Youth Hospital, Tenth Avenue, Windsor, 1971

The Sir Leslie Wilson Youth Detention Centre was a youth detention center at Windsor in Brisbane, Queensland, Australia. It was formerly known as the Sir Leslie Wilson Detention Centre and the Wilson Hospital. The Forde Inquiry into Abuse of Children in Queensland institutions recommended that the centre close as a matter of urgency. It closed in 2001.

== See also ==
- Punishment in Australia
