= Windsor, Queensland =

Windsor
- Suburb
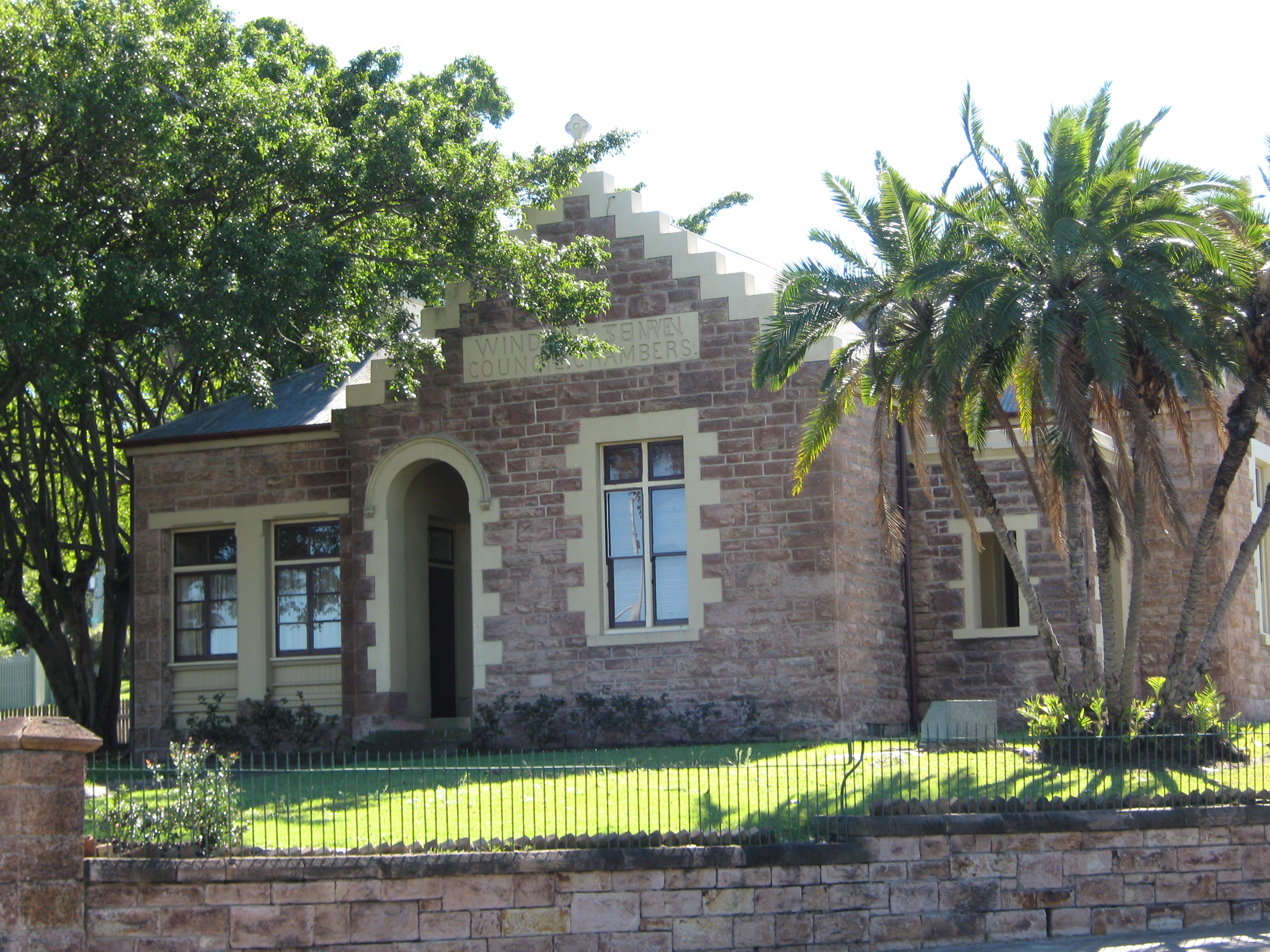
- Windsor Shire Council Chambers, later Windsor Town Council Chambers

- Interactive map of Windsor
- Coordinates: 27.4352°S 153.0291°E
- Country: Australia
- State: Queensland
- City: Brisbane
- LGA: City of Brisbane (Enoggera Ward; Hamilton Ward; Marchant Ward)
- Location: 5.5 km (3.4 mi) N of Brisbane CBD

Government
  - State electorates: Clayfield; Stafford
  - Federal division: Brisbane

Area
  - Total: 2.8 km^{2} (1.1 sq mi)
- Elevation: 13 m (43 ft)

Population
  - Total: 7,811 (2021 census)
  - Density: 2,790/km^{2} (7,230/sq mi)
- Time zone: UTC+10:00 (AEST)
- Postcode: 4030
Suburbs around Windsor
Grange	Lutwyche	Albion
Wilston	Windsor	Bowen Hills
Herston	Herston	Bowen Hills

Windsor is an inner northern suburb in the City of Brisbane, Queensland, Australia. In the 2021 census, Windsor had a population of 7,811 people.

== Geography ==
Windsor is located about 3.5 kilometres (2.2 mi) from the Brisbane central business district. It is largely residential, featuring many old Queenslanders, although there is also considerable retail commercial activity, primarily concentrated along Lutwyche and Newmarket Roads.

== History ==
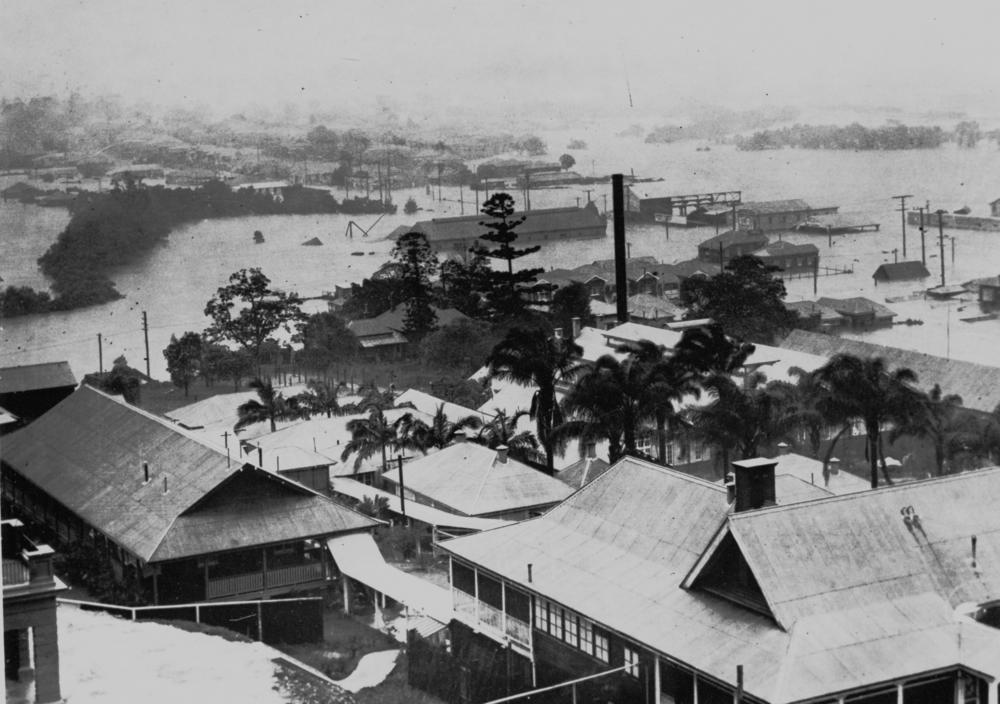
Flooding in 1931

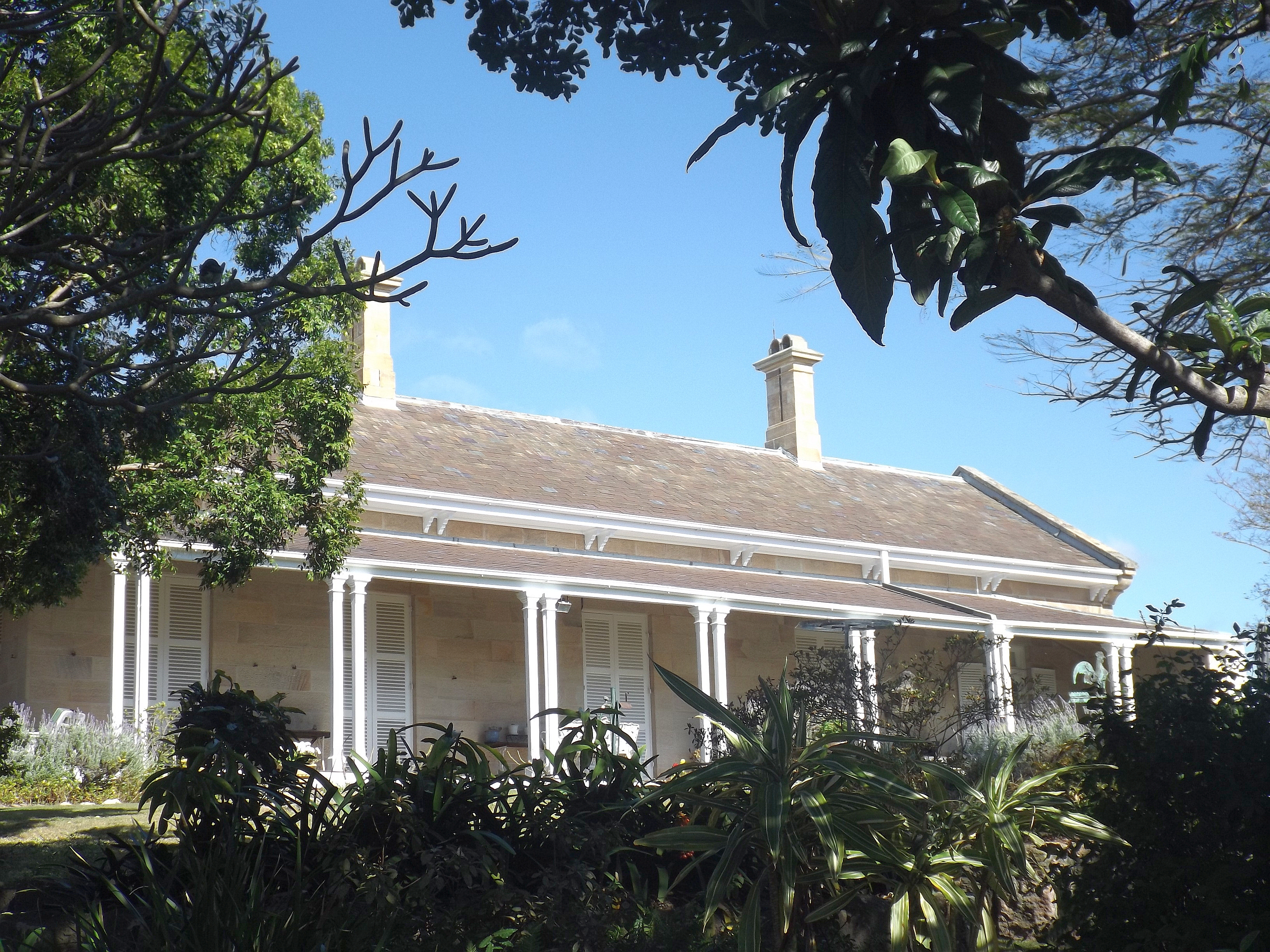
Oakwal, 2015

Land was first sold in this remote part of then New South Wales in 1854 and development was slow until the opening of the Bowen Bridge in 1860, named after the newly arrived first Governor of Queensland, Sir George Bowen, allowing easier access to the district. At that time the district was known as Breakfast Creek or Upper Breakfast Creek. Distinctive homes including Rosemount, Oakwal, The Bower, Wilston House and Eildon were built on large portions of land.

In 1864, pioneer settlers approached the Queensland Government for aid to establish a local school. The Bowen Bridge Road National School consisted of a simple wooden building and headmaster's house erected on a stone foundation and opened on 17 July 1865 on Bowen Bridge Road, adjacent to Thondley's Farm. Sixteen students enrolled for the first day and by the end of the first year, 112 students were on the register. In 1915, the school transferred across the road and was renamed Windsor State School. After World War I, the original school and headmaster's house was demolished and the land developed as the Windsor Memorial Park upon which a war memorial was constructed.

Swan Hill, O'Connell Town, Eildon, Albion, and Lutwyche were locality names before the appearance of the Windsor name when the shire council was formed.

The Shire of Windsor was formed in 1887. It was named after Windsor Castle in England as it was Queen Victoria's golden jubilee year. In July 1895, the Council decided to erect permanent chambers and consulted Brisbane-born architect Thomas Coutts, to design a council chambers. The first meeting of the Windsor Shire Council in the new premises was conducted on 9 March 1897. The building, constructed out of Brisbane tuff from the adjacent quarry, now home of the Windsor and Districts' Historical Society, is open every Sunday and Monday from 1–4 pm.

The Methodist Church opened on 13 August 1887 in a house on Nicholls Street in Swan Hill (now in Windsor) which was converted into a Sunday School and chapel. On 18 August 1889, a new church was opened on Swan Terrace. During the 1893 Brisbane flood, Swan Hill was badly flooded and many people took refuge in the church. After the flood, it was decided to relocate the church to higher ground to the present day location in Newmarket Road with the church re-opening there on 23 November 1902. When the Methodist Church amalgamated with the Presbyterian and Congregation Churches to form the Uniting Church in Australia in 1977, the church became known as Windsor Uniting Church.

In 1904, Windsor Shire Council became the Windsor Town Council. It contained the suburbs of Lutwyche, Wilston, Albion, Swan Hill, Eildon, O'Connell Town, The Grange (now simply Grange) and Wooloowin and portions of Kedron, Newmarket, and Eagle Junction.

In 1925, Windsor Town was amalgamated with 19 other shires and towns to form Greater Brisbane and former Windsor Town mayor, William Jolly became Mayor, and in the second term—Lord Mayor of Greater Brisbane.

On 18 August 1925, Archbishop Duhig purchased a property called Grafton Lodge on Bowen Bridge Road (now Roblane Street) for £1,750. Initially services were held in one of the houses on the property. On 1 August 1926, Monsignor James Byrne laid the foundation stone for a building to contain a church and a school. On 10 October 1926, Duhig blessed and opened the building, naming it Holy Rosary (and not St Anthony's as had been previously announced). The building was two storeys with the church above being 80 by 30 feet (24.4 by 9.1 m) with the school below being 70 by 50 feet (21 by 15 m). The architect was James Cavanagh and the builder Denis Cleary.

Wilson Ophthalmic Hostel School opened on 28 January 1929. Operated by the Queensland Government at Tenth Street (near Fifth Avenue, approx 27.4334°S 153.0282°E). It was a boarding facility where children from outside of Brisbane could be housed and schooled while being treated for ophthalmia at the Royal Children's Hospital at Herston. In 1953, it was renamed Wilson Hospital School and its role expanded to children requiring treatment for a range of other conditions. It closed in 1958, as the children could then be accommodated at the hospital itself.

Holy Rosary Catholic School opened on 28 January 1929 and was operated by the Sisters of St Joseph of the Sacred Heart. 120 students attended on the opening day.

The Windsor Presbyterian Church opened and dedicated on 14 April 1934 by Reverend John Sinclair, Moderator of the Brisbane Presbytery. The church was in King Street (but this was renamed Maygar Street in 1938). On 19 April 1959, a foundation stone for a new extension was laid commemorating 25 years of service.

Windsor Infants State School opened on 1 November 1934. It closed in 1971.

St Peter's Anglican Mission Hall on the corner of Lutwyche Road and Fuller Street (approx 27.4256°S 153.0323°E) was dedicated on 15 December 1935 by Coadjutor Bishop Horace Henry Dixon. It was needed to cope with the growth of the congregation at St Andrew's Anglican Church at Lutwyche. The building was a house converted to provide a chapel and a Sunday School with the intention to erect a purpose-built church at a later stage. On 12 April 1953, Archbishop Reginald Halse opened a new Sunday School building. St Peter's Anglican Mission Hall closed on 15 March 1987 with the approval of Assistant Bishop George Browning.

On Sunday 13 September 1953, Archbishop James Duhig laid the foundation stone for a new Holy Rosary Catholic Church costing £40,000. When the new church was completed, the school would expand into the old church. On 22 August 1954, Archbishop Duhig consecrated the new brick church in the presence of a crowd of 2000 people, many of whom listened from outside the church via loudspeaker.

Wilson Youth Hospital was established in June 1961 at Tenth Street following a refurbishment of the Wilson Hospital School (27.4334°S 153.0283°E) to create a more secure facility with a focus on detention. In 1983, it was renamed The Sir Leslie Wilson Youth Centre. In 1993, it was renamed the Sir Leslie Wilson Youth Detention Centre. It was operated by the Queensland Government and housed children who were breaking the law, "troubled" children as well as orphans, although the role of the centre changed over time. It was closed on 29 April 2001 and demolished soon after. There was an associated Wilson Youth Hospital School which operated from 1961 to 1968.

On 3 February 1964, "opportunity classes" (special education) were introduced at Windsor State School. On 23 January 1967, the special education program was established as a separate school, Windsor Special School, but still operating on the same site. The special school closed on 16 December 1994.

Prior to December 1968 the suburb was served by frequent Brisbane City Council tram services along Lutwyche Road, with routes converging from Chermside, Kalinga (until 1962), Stafford, and Grange the latter tram line branching off Lutwyche Road at Maygar street, on the border of Lutwyche and Windsor. These services combined to provide the suburb with an off-peak service of a tram every 2½ minutes along Lutwyche Road in the late 1950s. Two former tramway electrical substations remain features of Lutwyche Road, near Albion Road. One of these now houses the heritage collection of the Queensland Electrical Engineers Association.

Windsor contains a corridor gazetted by the Queensland government since 1972 for the construction of the Northern Freeway between Bowen Hills and Carseldine. Although the freeway was not built, the official plan still exists and a freeway through Windsor may be constructed in the future. Part of the original Northern Freeway is now the Clem Jones Tunnel (Clem7). It emerges close to Campbell Street, Bowen Hills. Several businesses along Lutwyche Road in Windsor were resumed as part of this process and as part of the Airport Link Tunnel and Northern Busway projects. Several of these businesses have protested the City Council's moves.

The 1974 floods affected the suburb. Various streets close to Breakfast Creek were affected.

At the start of 2013, Holy Rosary Catholic School was renamed St Mary of the Cross to commemorate St Mary MacKillop, Australian's first saint and the founder of the Sisters of St Joseph who had operated the school until 1977 after which it passed into lay leadership.

== Demographics ==
In the 2011 census, Windsor had a population of 6,389 people, with 49.1% female and 50.9% male. The median age of the Windsor population was 33 years, 4 years below the Australian median. Children aged under 15 years made up 15.9% of the population and people aged 65 years and over made up 9.2% of the population. 71.9% of people living in Windsor were born in Australia, compared to the national average of 69.8%. The other top responses for country of birth were England 3.5%, New Zealand 3.4%, India 3%, Italy 1.4%, Nepal 1%. 82.7% of people spoke only English at home; the next most popular languages were 2.2% Italian, 1% Mandarin, 0.9% Nepali, 0.8% Punjabi, 0.8% Hindi.

In the 2016 census, Windsor had a population of 7,013 people.

In the 2021 census, Windsor had a population of 7,811 people.

== Heritage listings ==
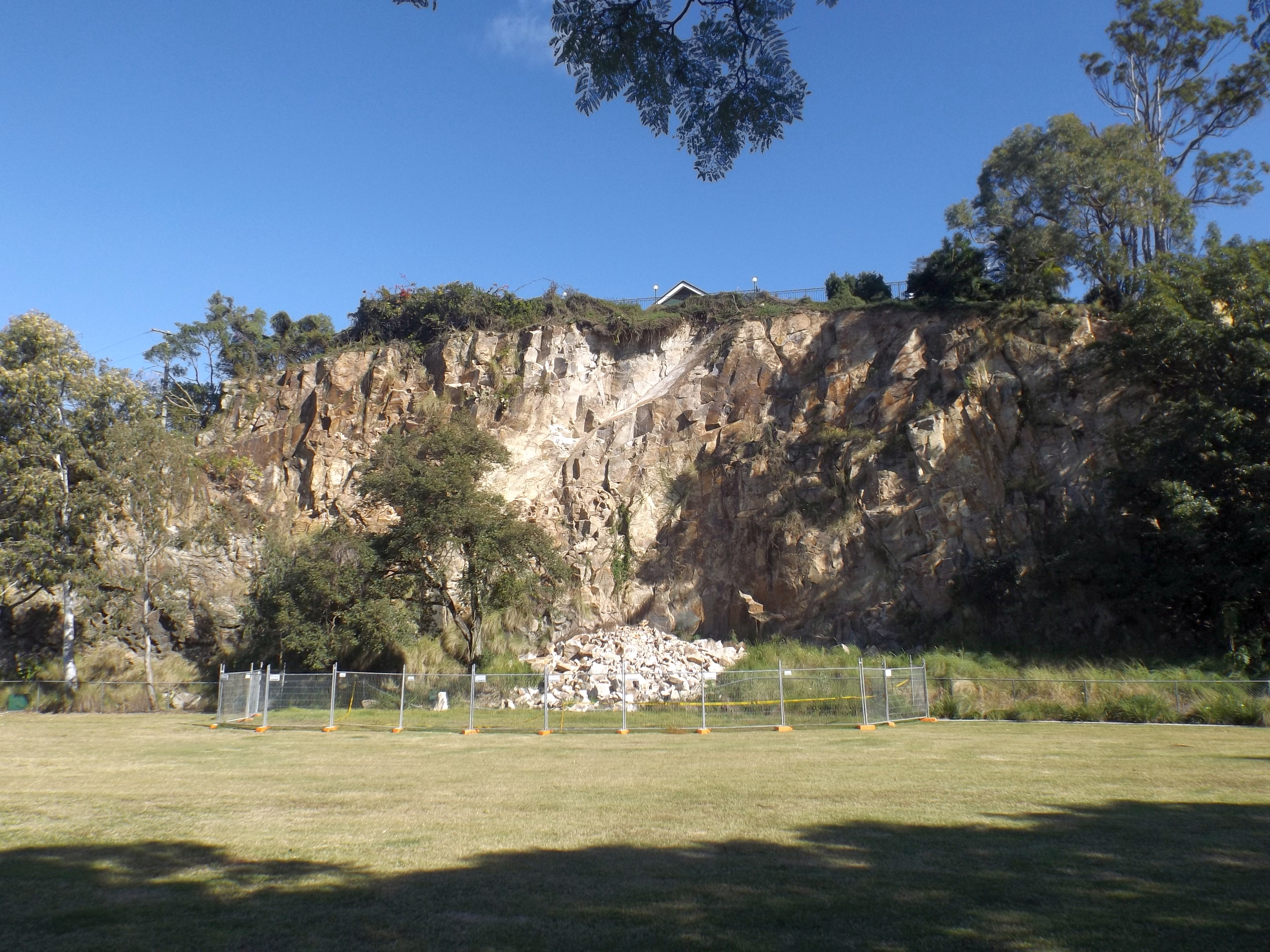
Quarry and Park, 2015

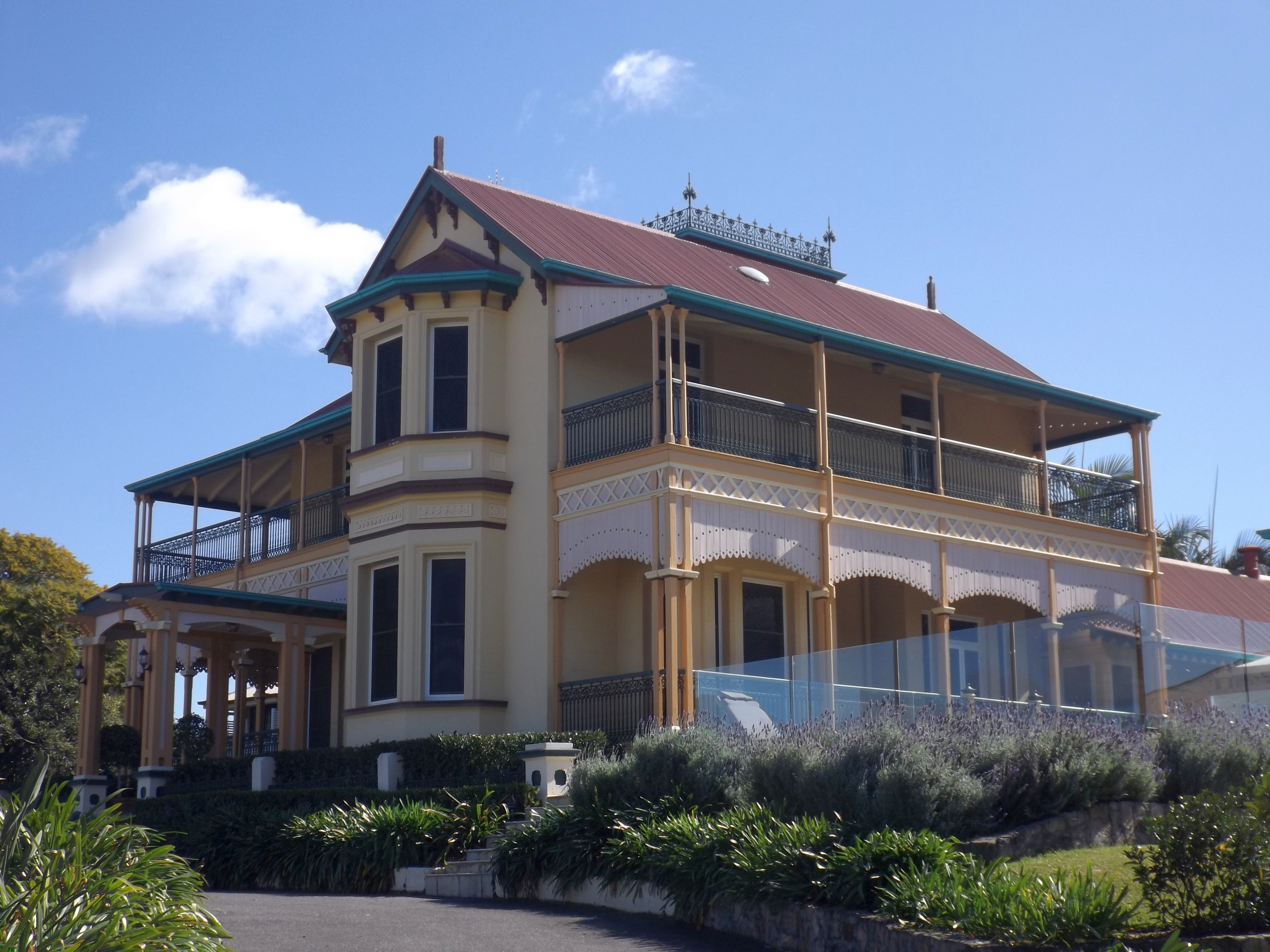
Boothville House, 2015

Windsor has a number of heritage-listed sites, including:

- Bess Street Brick Cottages, 22, 25–27 Bess Street
- Skilmorlie, 16 Bryden Street
- Oakwal, 50 Bush Street
- The Grange, 38 Crowther Street
- Craigellachie, 10 Fosbery Street
- Rosemount Hospital, 189 Lutwyche Road
- Windsor State School, 270 Lutwyche Road
- Windsor War Memorial Park, 311 Lutwyche Road
- former Windsor Town Quarry Park and Tramways Substation No. 6, 356 Lutwyche Road
- former Windsor Shire Council Chambers, 356 Lutwyche Road
- Kirkston, 23 Rupert Street
- Boothville House, 43 Seventh Avenue

== Transport ==
Windsor railway station on Eildon Road (27.4353°S 153.0292°E) provides access to regular Queensland Rail City network services to Ferny Grove, Brisbane and Beenleigh.

== Education ==
Windsor State School is a government primary (Prep–6) school for boys and girls at Harris Street (27.4305°S 153.0296°E). In 2018, the school had an enrolment of 708 students with 49 teachers (43 full-time equivalent) and 35 non-teaching staff (21 full-time equivalent). It includes a special education program.

St Mary of the Cross School is a Catholic primary (Prep–6) school for boys and girls at 22 Grafton Street (27.4323°S 153.0328°E). In 2018, the school had an enrolment of 78 students with 13 teachers (9 full-time equivalent) and 14 non-teaching staff (5 full-time equivalent). It is set to close at the end of the 2026 school year, and to be re-developed into a secondary school.

There are no secondary schools in Windsor. The nearest government secondary schools are Kedron State High School in Kedron to the north and Fortitude Valley State Secondary College in Fortitude Valley to the south.

== Amenities ==
Holy Rosary Catholic Church is at 18 Bonython Street (27.4314°S 153.0332°E). It is within the Parish of Holy Cross, Wooloowin.

Windsor Uniting Church is at 66 Newmarket Road on the corner of Green Terrace (27.4378°S 153.0273°E). The church contains an Honour Roll commemorating those who served in World War I.

Windsor Presbyterian Church is at 53 Maygar Street (27.4268°S 153.0293°E).

== Landmarks ==
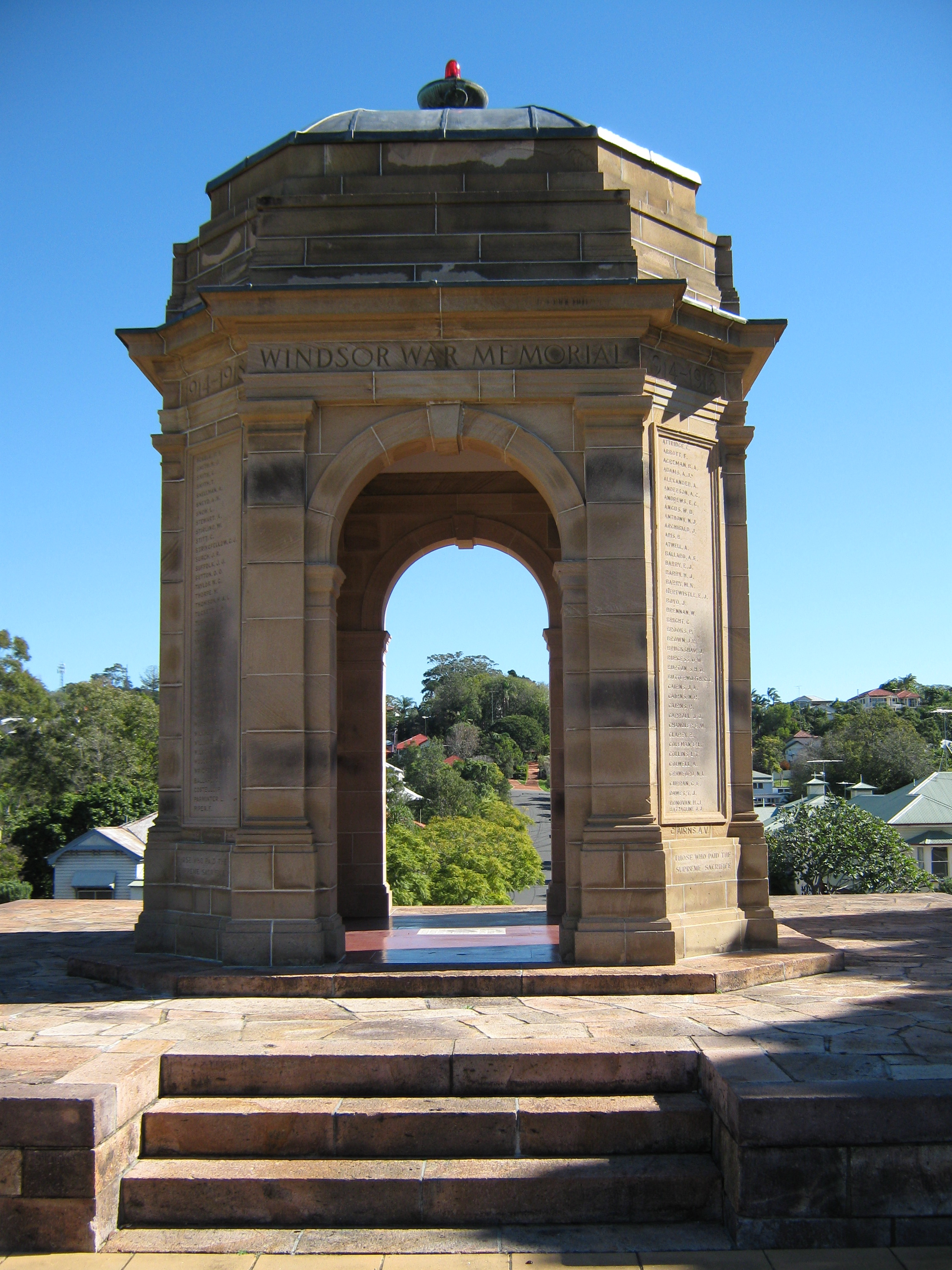
Cenotaph in Windsor War Memorial Park

In 1925, a Cenotaph was erected on the site of the old school in the memory of the men who had enlisted from the Town of Windsor and who had lost their lives in World War I. It was unveiled on 25 April 1925 (Anzac Day) by the Member of the Queensland Legislative Assembly for Windsor, Charles Taylor. A rotunda bandstand was erected in War Memorial Park and provided shelter for the Windsor Town Band, which played there on Sundays.

The former Windsor Shire Council Chambers is bounded by Lutwyche Road, Hawkins and Palmer Streets. The building was erected in 1896–97 and housed the offices and chambers of the Windsor Shire Council and Windsor Town Council until 1925. It was constructed by William Parsons from locally quarried porphyry (Brisbane tuff), with dressed sandstone facings and trimmings. It is capped with a corrugated iron gabled roof. A sandstone slab on the front gable bears the inscription Windsor Shire Council Chambers, with the word 'Shire' overwritten by 'Town'.

Downey Park, the so-called "home of women's sport in Brisbane" is located in Windsor. It is a Local Heritage Place, considered so for its significant historical and social meaning. The home of the Brisbane Softball Association, this site has played a huge part in the maintenance of softball as a valid choice for women's sport and has produced many significant athletes who compete on a national and international level.

Just next to the park is the Northey St City Farm, which first opened in 1994 and provides hands-on education and training in agricultural activities. The farm also features a plant nursery and markets every Sunday morning.
