= James Cockle (surgeon) =

British surgeon

James Cockle (17 July 1782 – 8 December 1854) was a prominent British surgeon and father of eventual Chief Justice of Queensland, Sir James Cockle.

== Early life and education ==
Cockle was born in Woodbridge, Suffolk to Andrew Cockle—a vintner—and his wife, Anne. He went up to the University of Edinburgh in 1801 and began practising as a doctor in 1805. He became the parochial surgeon at Great Oakley, Essex before moving to London in the early 1820s.

== Career ==
Initially working as an apothecary in Hackney, Cockle moved to New Ormond Street in 1829 and developed an extremely successful medical firm. By 1837, his clients included some of the capital's most influential people. These included:

- William Lamb, 2nd Viscount Melbourne – Prime Minister
- Henry Temple, 3rd Viscount Palmerston – Foreign Secretary
- Charles Dickens – author

Other prominent figures who were clients of Cockle included one Archbishop, seven Dukes, fifty-six lesser peers, fourteen bishops and three other Cabinet Ministers besides those above.

== Personal life ==
Cockle married Elizabeth Moss in 1811 and the couple had five sons and a daughter:

- George Cockle (died 1900) (had daughter by Miss Charlotte Pittaway)
- Dr John Cockle (1814–1900) – doctor
- Charles Moss-Cockle (?—1904) – solicitor
- Elizabeth Cockle (married Colonel Draffen)
- Sir James Cockle (14 January 1819 – 27 January 1895) – Chief Justice of Queensland

== Death ==
Cockle died on 8 December 1854 at 18 New Ormond Street, Queen Square, London with an estate of £37,085, approximately £2.6 million with inflation adjusted as of 2008. His business become a limited company in 1917 but closed around 1960.
