= Boothville House =

Boothville
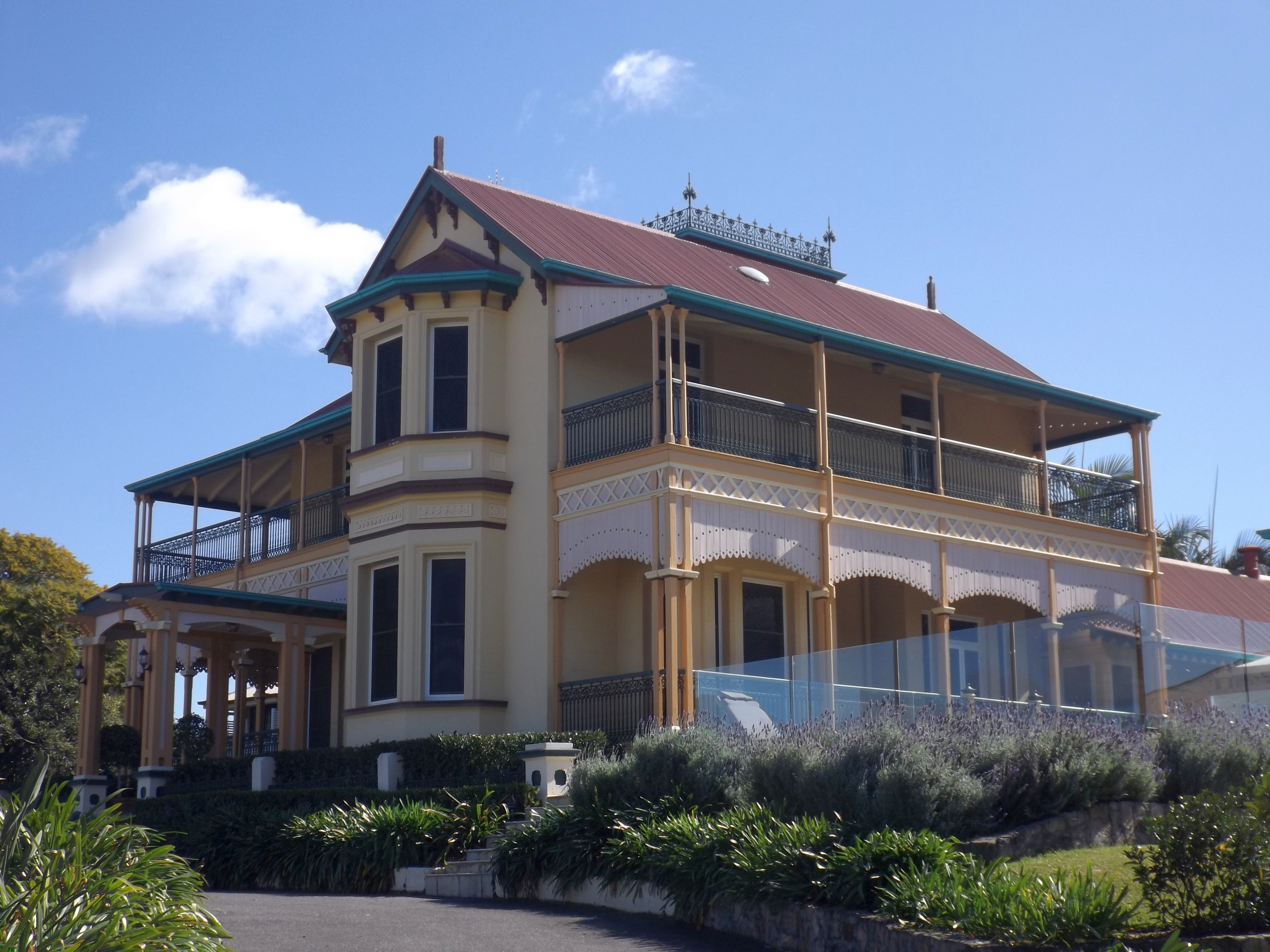
- Residence in 2015

- Location within Queensland Location within Australia
- 27.4345°S 153.0257°E
- Location: 43 Seventh Avenue, Windsor, City of Brisbane, Queensland, Australia

History
- Design period: 1870s–1890s (late 19th century)
- Built: 1887 – c. 1900

Queensland Heritage Register
- Official name: Boothville, Monte Video
- Type: state heritage (built, landscape)
- Designated: 21 October 1992
- Reference no.: 600352
- Significant period: 1880s–1900s (fabric); 1880s–1920s (historical); 1920s–1990s (social)
- Significant components: billiards room, trees/plantings, garden edging/balustrades/planter boxes, well, carriage way/drive, service wing, residential accommodation – main house, chapel, garden/grounds

Boothville is a heritage-listed villa and former maternity hospital at 43 Seventh Avenue, Windsor, City of Brisbane, Queensland, Australia. It was built from 1887 to c. 1900. It is also known as Monte Video. It was added to the Queensland Heritage Register on 21 October 1992.

== History ==
This two-storeyed brick residence, formerly known as Monte Video, was erected in 1887 for Henry Wallis Glenny, head office manager of the Queensland National Bank from 1884 to 1892.

Between 1885 and 1887 Glenny acquired several Eildon Hill subdivisions, including the Boothville site. Usually, the Queensland National Bank provided residential accommodation for their managers, but in Glenny's case the directors granted him a loan of £6,500 on 23 March 1887, to build his residence. The house may have been designed by former colonial architect Francis Drummond Greville Stanley, who designed a large number of bank offices and residences for the Queensland National Bank, including the head office in Brisbane, erected 1881–85.

In 1892 Glenny retired from the Queensland National Bank, which purchased the house from him. It was rented briefly but mostly remained unoccupied until Walter Vardon Ralston, the new general manager of the bank, and his family occupied the residence in 1896. Initially Ralston rented the house for £150 per annum, but later this was waived, and in 1918 he purchased Monte Video from the bank. During the Ralstons' occupancy a single-storeyed timber extension, which housed a large billiard room and beyond that an L-shaped sunroom opening to an eastern porch, aviary and fernery, was added at the rear c. 1900.

Walter Ralston died in 1920 but his widow remained in the house until 1922.

In 1923 Monte Video was acquired by William Bramwell Booth, son of William Booth the English founder of the Salvation Army. He purchased the property on behalf of the organisation, and in May 1924 the Salvation Army Mothers Hospital moved from Breakfast Creek to Monte Video, which was renamed Boothville. Boothville provided maternity and adoption services for single mothers.

In June 1929, the Monte Video Estate consisted of 29 home blocks was available for sale by auction by Isles, Love and Co and F. E. Short.

Apart from a small portion of land which was sold in 1925 to P & AE Nelson, and which was bequeathed back to the Salvation Army in 1956, the hospital and grounds have remained part of the Salvation Army Queensland Property Trust since 1933.

A number of buildings associated with the hospital have been erected on the site since 1924. These include a single-storeyed building which was transported from the hospital's previous site at Breakfast Creek, raised to two-storey height and built in underneath, and a cottage which was relocated from a site in Jephson Street in Toowong in 1962.

A brick labour ward was added in the 1970s, and more recently the courtyard between the two rear wings has been covered and concreted. Recently a brick theatre wing has been added off the eastern side of the timber wing.

The Salvation Army ceased to operate Boothville as a hospital in 1994 and it was restored as a private residence. In July 2013, Boothville was sold for $3.9 million.

- It is claimed that several of the details relating to the Salvation Army era of the property as recounted above should be revised:-
1. That the property was more probably purchased by the Salvation Army in 1924.
2. That although the title of the property would have been in the name of General Bramwell Booth, as were all Salvation Army properties at that time, it would have been acquired by a regional officer of the Salvation Army.
3. The Salvation Army Maternity Home at Breakfast Creek carried on its work of accepting women from disadvantaged social circumstances for their confinement until about 1926. "Boothville" Mothers' Hospital was not a replacement for this Home but was intended "as an intermediary hospital where mothers of moderate means will be able to secure the same good nursing as their more affluent sisters do elsewhere."

== Description ==
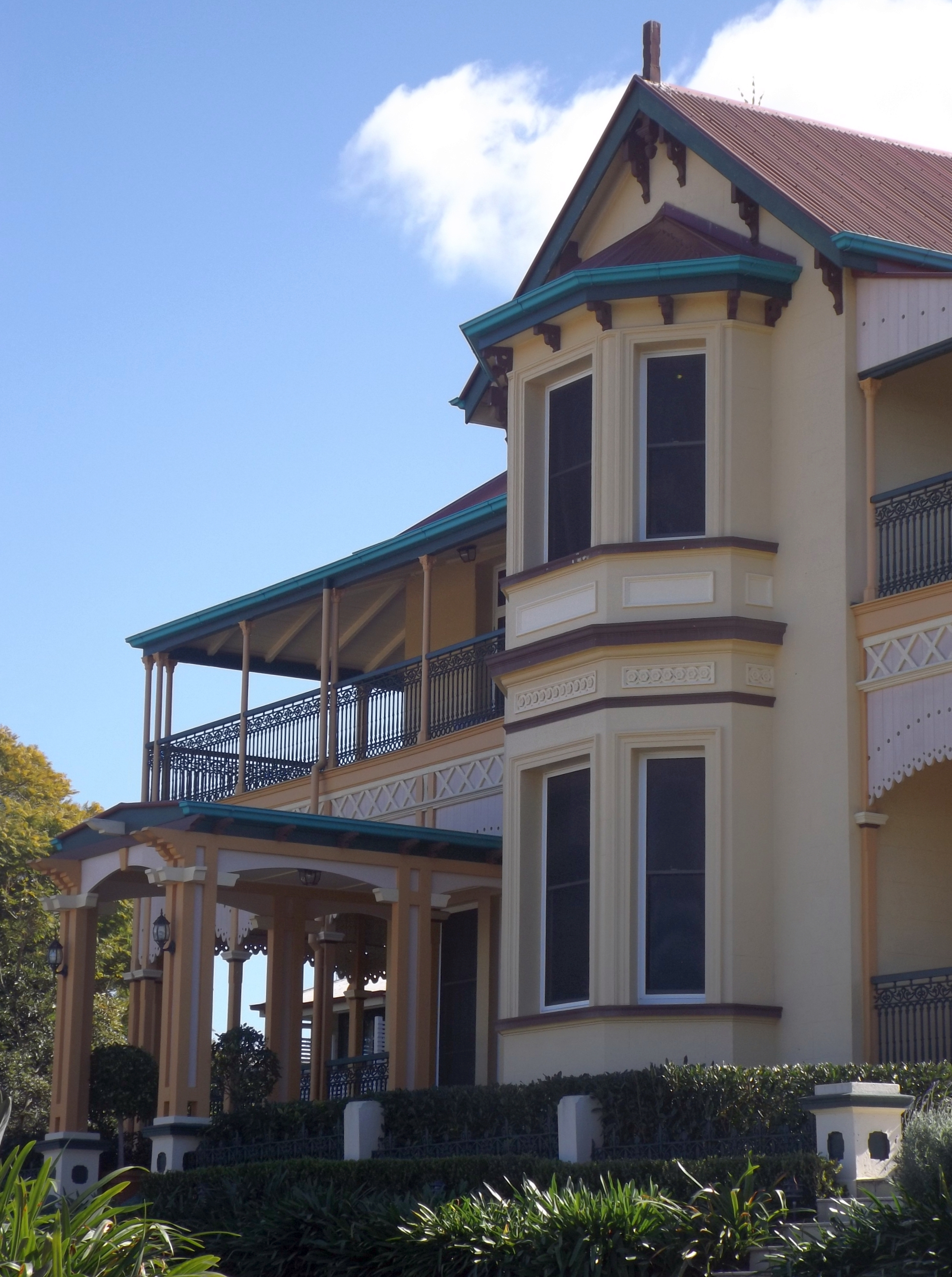
Entrance, 2015

Located on over 0.8 hectares (2.0 acres) of hilltop land, Boothville is a complex of double and single-storeyed timber and masonry buildings. The original rendered masonry and timber house remains as the main focal building, sited in a commanding position at the crest of the hill.

The main building has a long thin U-shaped plan consisting of, to the south, the original double-storeyed masonry house with now enclosed timber verandahs, its single storeyed rendered masonry service wing to the north-west, and the c. 1900 single-storeyed L-shaped timber addition to the north east. The roof is a series of intersecting pitches dominated by the main roof, which features a flattened central portion bound by a cast iron decorative balustrade with finials.

The front (south) elevation of the original house features a double-storeyed bay window under a gable end with carved eaves brackets, and a projecting timber entrance portico with three-post columns, shaped rafter ends and stained glass panels. Verandahs to the south and east have been enclosed with weatherboard, and sheeted in to the west. On both the west and eastern elevations, remains of decorative timber detailing to the verandahs can be seen, with arched battening, a herring bone frieze, and timber columns with capitals. The covered walkway to the service wing to the north features cast iron columns with corinthian capitals.

The entrance door which connected the southern portico to the entry vestibule has been replaced, but its cedar surrounds with stained glass remain. The entry vestibule features a rendered masonry archway at the foot of finely carved timber stairs. To the east is a grand reception room, with an ornate plaster cornice and richly detailed timber and tiled fireplace. The room has folding cedar doors which once linked it to a parlour which is now a ward. The office to the west has elaborate and finely carved timber cupboards, side board, mirrors and overmantel framing a mosaic tiled fireplace built into the northern wall. The "service wing" to the rear consists of a large former dining room, a smaller room with a corner fireplace which is now enclosed and which probably functioned as the servants' hall, a large kitchen, and a pantry and scullery, which are now storerooms.

At half-landing level, the stairs lead to a small timber-lined room and another narrower staircase, which leads to what was probably the servants' bedroom above the dining room. Narrow back stairs also lead from the service wing to this bedroom and from the half-landing level to an upper floor room, which was probably the nursery. The top floor housed four bedrooms and a dressing room, which now serve as wards and a kitchen. The principal rooms feature carved timber mantelpieces, and the southern rooms have excellent views of the inner north-western suburbs and city centre.

The grounds retain remnants of the former garden, terracing and fernery and established trees are located around the boundary. Low masonry fences with cast-iron balustrading define the front terraces. The western side of the house has an old well (which had been sealed over c. 1924 but was re-opened in 1986), and a Garden Chapel. A bitumen driveway follows the original curve around the front lawn to a semi-circular parking area, formerly the carriage reception area, and continues in the direction of the now demolished coach house at the rear. Much of the brick guttering to the early driveway survives.

Despite modification for its function as a maternity hospital, the essential form of the main building remains intact, as do major internal decorative features. The modifications have not substantially diminished the picturesque quality of the siting of the building, its grounds, and some of its external features.

== Heritage listing ==
Boothville was listed on the Queensland Heritage Register on 21 October 1992 having satisfied the following criteria.

The place is important in demonstrating the evolution or pattern of Queensland's history.

Boothville is important in demonstrating the pattern of development of Brisbane's northern suburbs in the late 19th century. It is a large, fundamentally intact masonry residence of the late 1880s which, together with the surviving grounds, is representative of more affluent late 19th century domestic architecture and landscaping in Brisbane.

The place is important in demonstrating the principal characteristics of a particular class of cultural places.

It is a large, fundamentally intact masonry residence of the late 1880s which, together with the surviving grounds, is representative of more affluent late 19th century domestic architecture and landscaping in Brisbane.

The place is important because of its aesthetic significance.

The picturesque quality of the siting and remaining external features of the main building at Boothville, and its grounds, make an important contribution to the Windsor townscape. The core building contains finely crafted timber joinery, plaster cornices and leadlights.

The place has a strong or special association with a particular community or cultural group for social, cultural or spiritual reasons.

Boothville is significant for its special association with the work of the Salvation Army in Queensland, and has social significance as a maternity hospital for nearly 7 decades.

The place has a special association with the life or work of a particular person, group or organisation of importance in Queensland's history.

Boothville is significant for its special association with the work of the Salvation Army in Queensland, and has social significance as a maternity hospital for nearly 7 decades.
