= Craigellachie, Windsor =

Craigellachie
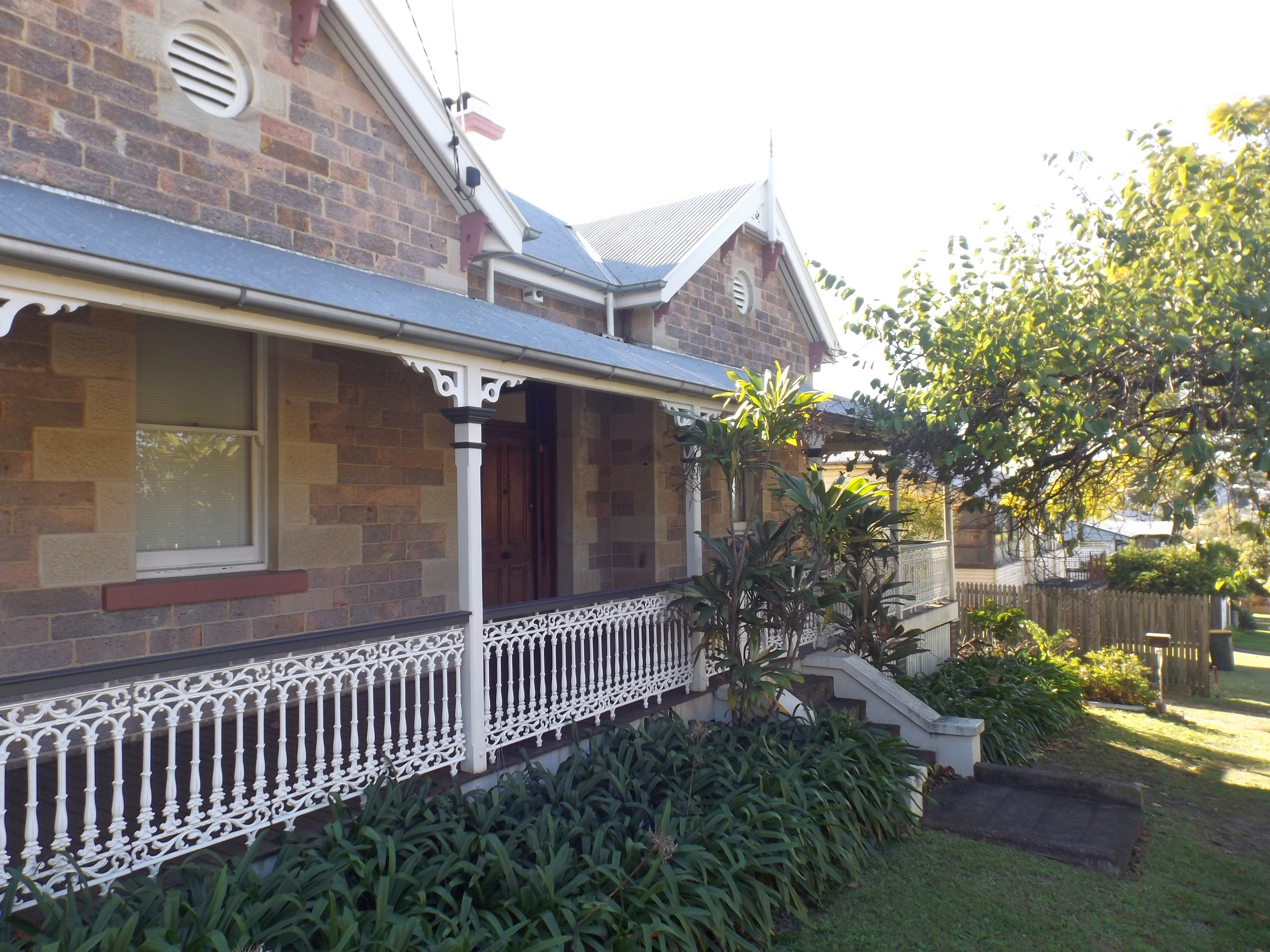
- Street front, 2015

- Location within Queensland Location within Australia
- 27.4277°S 153.0336°E
- Location: 10 Fosbery Street, Windsor, City of Brisbane, Queensland, Australia

History
- Design period: 1870s–1890s (late 19th century)
- Built: c. 1889
- Built for: John Grant

Queensland Heritage Register
- Official name: Craigellachie
- Type: state heritage (built)
- Designated: 21 October 1992
- Reference no.: 600348
- Significant period: 1880s–1890s (fabric); 1880s (historical)
- Significant components: residential accommodation – main house, service wing, cellar
- Builders: John Grant

Craigellachie is a heritage-listed detached house at 10 Fosbery Street, Windsor, City of Brisbane, Queensland, Australia. It was built c. 1889 by its owner John Grant, a stonemason. It was added to the Queensland Heritage Register on 21 October 1992.

== History ==
Craigellachie, a single-storeyed masonry residence, was constructed during the late 1880s boom. It was a resubdivision of Windsor-Lutwyche for closer settlement. It was erected by master stonemason John Grant as his family home.

In 1887 Grant purchased just over an acre of land in what was then known as Alice Street. Two years later he raised a mortgage of £450 on the property, which most likely financed the construction of the house in late 1889 or early 1890.

The first mention of the house was in 1890 when John's second daughter Annie married Colin W MacIntyre on 31 December 1889, at Craigellachie, Lutwyche, in The Telegraph newspaper. The house name does not appear in post office directories until 1904.

Grant and his wife Jane raised eight children at Craigellachie. He died aged forty-five in December 1899, but the house remained the property of the Grant family until 1974.

The residence was converted into three flats probably in the late 1940s or 1950s, but was refurbished in the mid-1970s. The interior was returned to its original layout, paint to joinery and doors was removed, and the exterior was renovated.

Craigellachie remains a family home.

== Description ==
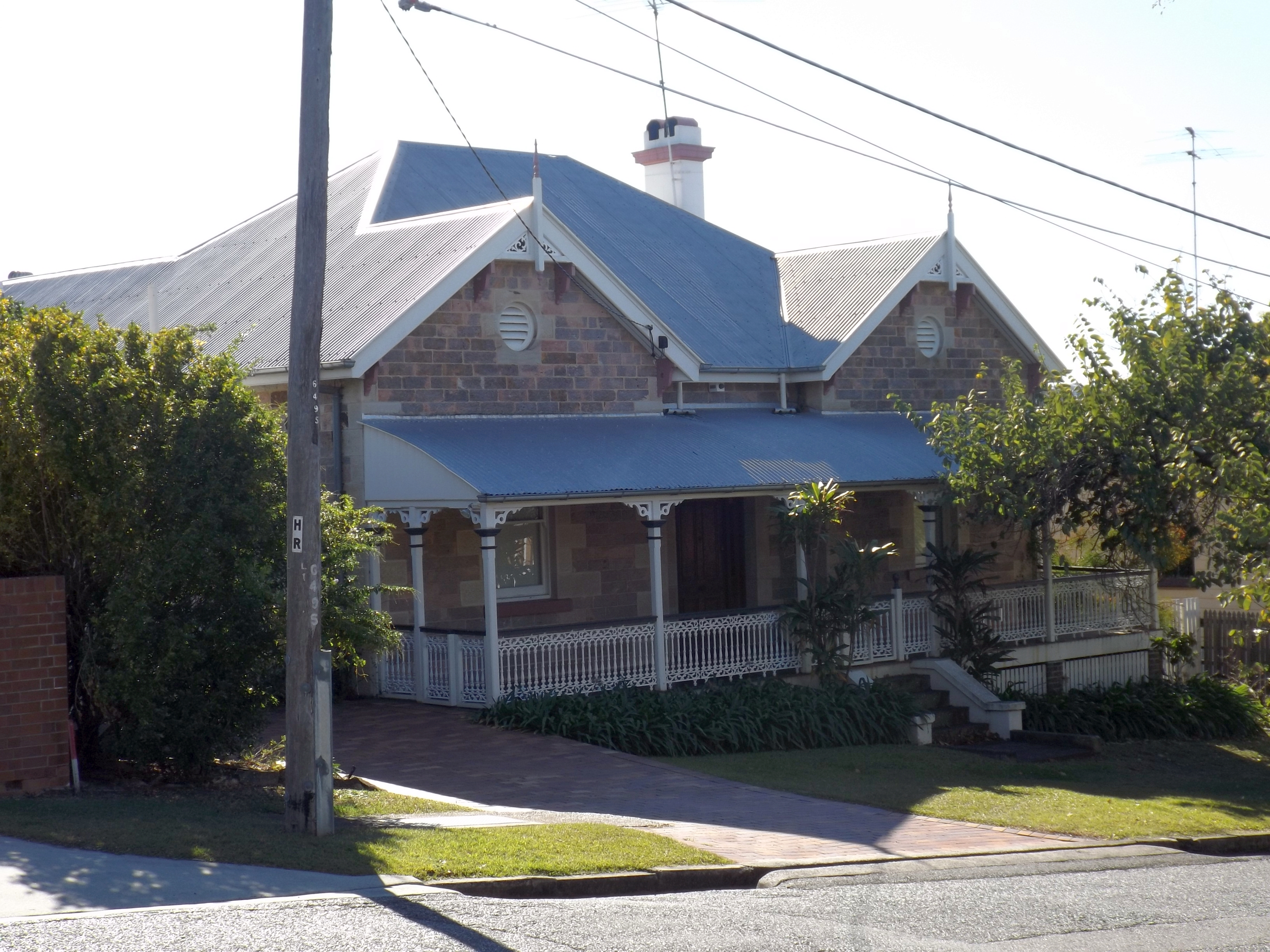
View from the opposite side of Fosbery Street, 2015

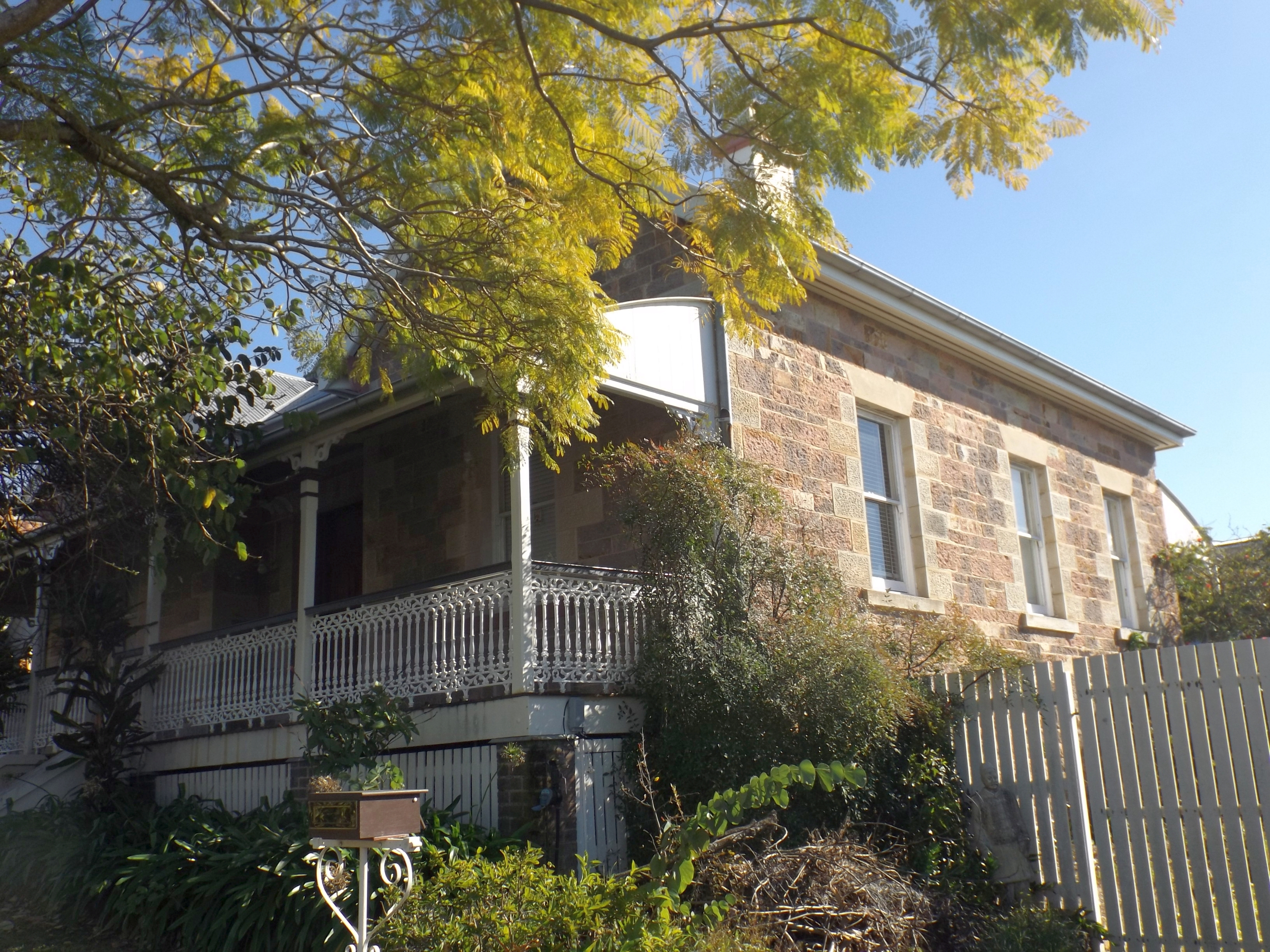
Side view, 2015

Craigellachie is a modestly proportioned, single-storeyed house with fine stone detailing and Georgian features unusual in a house of this size. It retains its original attached brick service wing and two cellars beneath the core.

The main building is constructed of Brisbane tuff, sandstone and brick, with timber floors and an iron roof. Most likely the adjacent Windsor quarry across Lutwyche Road supplied the stone for the foundations and walls, and it is believed the dressed sandstone employed on quoining and facings originated from the Albion Quarry behind Bartley's Hill. Bricks used in the kitchen house and internal walls were probably manufactured locally, Lutwyche-Windsor being an early brickmaking centre.

The front features twin projecting gables, each with a circular louvred vent in the gable end, plain bargeboards, timber console brackets, fretwork infill, finial and pendant.

It is unified by a full-length verandah resting on brick piers. This is shaded by a convex corrugated iron roof supported by timber posts with capitals and fretwork brackets. The balustrade is of cast aluminium.

Internally the house consists of a wide, central arched hallway with to the right a living and dining room, each with a cedar fireplace, and to the left three bedrooms.

All the windows are sashed, and joinery and doors (with fanlights) throughout are of cedar. A doorway into the front living room has been widened at some stage.

There is an attached brick kitchen wing at the western rear of the building and an L-shaped back verandah. This is unadorned. Recent owners have installed new bathrooms in the core and have renovated the kitchen wing to include a modern kitchen, breakfast room, laundry and shower room.

Externally the house remains substantially intact.

== Heritage listing ==
Craigellachie was listed on the Queensland Heritage Register on 21 October 1992 having satisfied the following criteria.

The place demonstrates rare, uncommon or endangered aspects of Queensland's cultural heritage.

Craigellachie is significant as a rare Brisbane example of stone and brick employed in a non-elite home of the 1880s.

The place is important in demonstrating the principal characteristics of a particular class of cultural places.

Craigellachie is significant as a surviving Brisbane example of a late nineteenth century artisan's home and for its contribution to the Lutwyche-Windsor townscape, which retains a number of nineteenth century masonry buildings.

The place is important because of its aesthetic significance.

Craigellachie is an accomplished building in design, detail and material, which contributes aesthetically to the streetscape.

Craigellachie is significant as a surviving Brisbane example of a late nineteenth century artisan's home and for its contribution to the Lutwyche-Windsor townscape, which retains a number of nineteenth century masonry buildings.
