= James Cockle =

Australian judge (1819–1895)

The Honourable Sir James Cockle
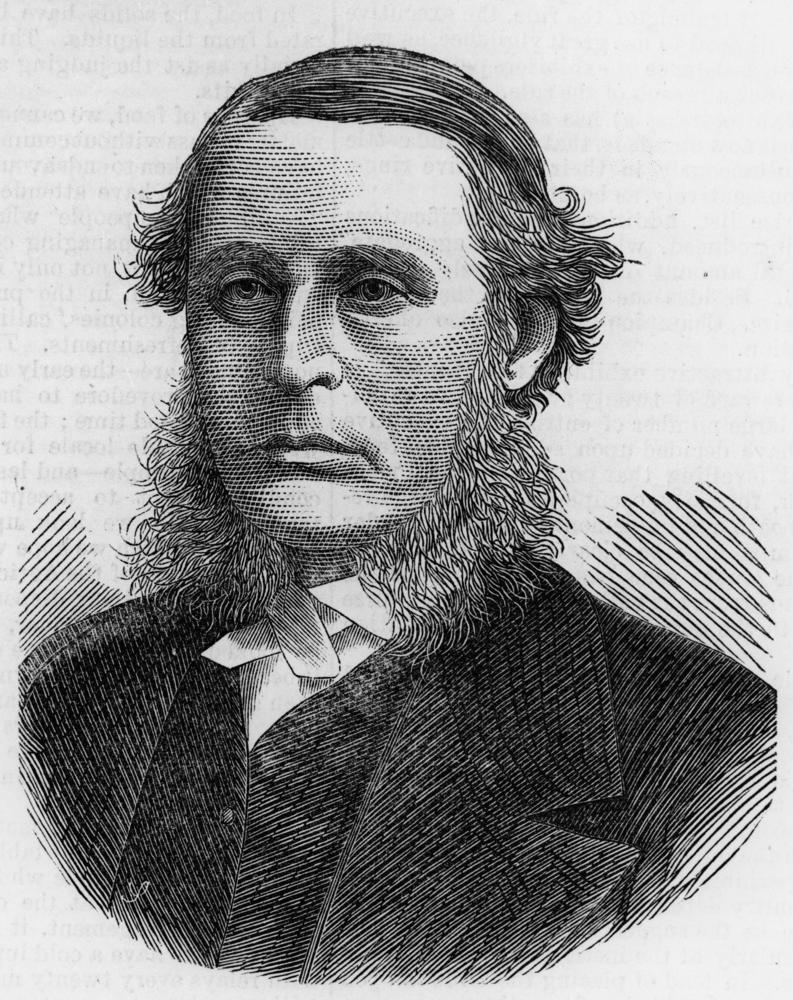
- Sir James Cockle, first Chief Justice of Queensland, 1876

1st Chief Justice of Queensland
- In office 21 February 1863 – 24 June 1879
- Succeeded by: Charles Lilley

Personal details
- Born: 14 January 1819
- Died: 27 January 1895 (aged 76) London
- Known for: Method of differential resolvents Split-quaternion; Tessarines

Sir James Cockle FRS FRAS FCPS (14 January 1819 – 27 January 1895) was an English lawyer and mathematician.

Cockle was born on 14 January 1819. He was the second son of James Cockle, a surgeon, of Great Oakley, Essex. Educated at Charterhouse and Trinity College, Cambridge, he entered the Middle Temple in 1838, practising as a special pleader in 1845 and being called in 1846. Joining the midland circuit, he acquired a good practice, and on the recommendation of Chief Justice Sir William Erle he was appointed as the first Chief Justice of the Supreme Court of Queensland in Queensland, Australia on 21 February 1863; he served until his retirement on 24 June 1879. Cockle was made a Fellow of the Royal Society (FRS) on 1 June 1865. He received the honour of knighthood on 29 July 1869. He returned to England in 1878.

== Personal life ==
Sir James married Adelaide, who became Lady Cockle when he was knighted in 1869.

His residence Oakwal in Windsor, Queensland, Brisbane is listed on the Queensland Heritage Register. It is believed they derived the name Oakwal from Cockle's birthplace at Great Oakley in Essex and his wife's birthplace of Walton in Suffolk.

== Mathematical and scientific investigations ==
Cockle is also remembered for his mathematical and scientific investigations. For instance he invented the number systems of tessarines and coquaternions, and worked with Arthur Cayley (1821–1895) on the theory of linear algebra. Like many young mathematicians he attacked the problem of solving the quintic equation, notwithstanding Abel–Ruffini theorem that a solution by radicals was impossible. In this field Cockle achieved some notable results, amongst which is his reproduction of Sir William R. Hamilton's modification of Abel's theorem. Algebraic forms were a favourite object of his studies. He also made contributions to the theory of differential equations, in particular the development of the theory of differential invariants or criticoids.

He displayed a keen interest in scientific societies. From 1863 to 1879 he was president of the Queensland Philosophical Society (now incorporated in the Royal Society of Queensland); and was elected to Corresponding membership of the Manchester Literary and Philosophical Society in 1870. On his return to England he became associated with the London Mathematical Society, of which he was president from 1886 to 1888, and the Royal Astronomical Society, serving as a member of the council from 1888 to 1892. He died in London on 27 January 1895.

An obituary notice by the Revd. Robert Harley was published in 1895 in Proc. Roy. Soc. vol. 59. A volume containing his scientific and mathematical researches made during the years 1864–1877 was presented to the British Museum in 1897 by his widow. Like his father, Cockle became wealthy during his lifetime, leaving an estate of £32,169, which is approximately £2.7 million if adjusted for inflation as of 2008.

== Works ==
Biodiversity Heritage Library has London-Dublin-Edinburgh Philosophical Magazine, series 3 and 4, where articles by James Cockle were published:

- 1848: On Certain Functions Resembling Quaternions and on a New Imaginary in Algebra, 33:435–9.
- 1849: On a New Imaginary in Algebra 34:37–47.
- 1849: On the Symbols of Algebra and on the Theory of Tessarines 34:406–10.
- 1849: On Systems of Algebra involving more than one Imaginary, and on Equations of the Fifth Degree 35: 434 to 7
- 1850: On the True Amplitude of a Tessarine, on the Origin of the word Theodolite, and on Light under the action of Magnetism 36:290–2.
- 1850: On Impossible Equations, on Impossible Quantities and on Tessarines 37:281–3.
- 1851: On the Solution of Certain Systems of Equations series 4, 2: 289 to 93
- 1852: On Algebraic Transformation, on Quadruple Algebra and on the Theory of Equations, series 4, 3 : 436 to 39
- 1852: On the Method of Symmetric Products 4: 492 to 96
- 1853 Method of Symmetric Products, continued 5: 170 to 74
- 1853: Fragment on Multiple Values 6: 444 to 48
- 1854: On Method of Symmetric Products, concluded 7: 130 to 38

Cockle also wrote a series "Method of Vanishing Groups" for the Cambridge and Dublin Mathematical Journal, volumes and pages 2: 267 to 73, 3: 179 to 81, and 4: 174 to 78.

== See also ==
- Judiciary of Australia
- List of judges of the Supreme Court of Queensland

Legal offices
New office	Chief Justice of Queensland; 1863 – 1879	Succeeded by Charles Lilley
