= Great Oakley, Essex =

Village in Essex, England

Coordinates: 51.904°N 1.190°E

Great Oakley
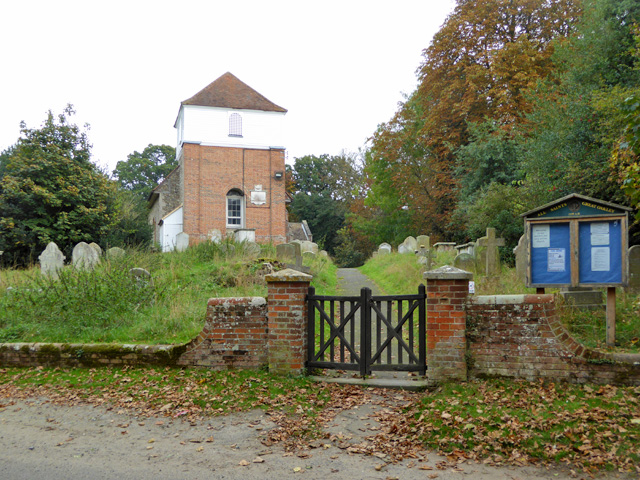
- All Saints' Church

- Location within Essex
- Population: 1,048 (Parish, 2021)
- OS grid reference: TM194276
- Civil parish: Great Oakley
- District: Tendring
- Shire county: Essex
- Region: East
- Country: England
- Sovereign state: United Kingdom
- Post town: Harwich
- Postcode district: CO12
- Dialling code: 01255
- Police: Essex
- Fire: Essex
- Ambulance: East of England
- UK Parliament: Harwich and North Essex

Great Oakley is a village and civil parish in the Tendring district of Essex, England. It is a long, narrow parish lying on the top of a low (25 m) ridge south of Ramsey Creek which drains northeast towards Harwich. The parish extends south to Oakley Creek, a branch of Hamford Water, where stood Great Oakley Dock, now disused. At the 2021 census the parish had a population of 1,048.

The church, dedicated to All Saints, contains some Norman work. The living thereof is in the gift of St John's College, Cambridge.

The village is served by All Saints Great Oakley C of E Primary School.

A public house called The Three Cups – after the emblem of the Salters' Company – used to be situated in the village, indicating that there were salt works in the area. The parish still contains a large chemical works (the Great Oakley Works), operated by EPC-UK, which produces the cetane improver 2-ethyl hexyl nitrate, and also provides specialist explosives handling services.

The village now has only one public house, called The Maybush Inn, which in 2016 was reopened as a Community Pub.

The village has a men's football team, Great Oakley FC, which plays in the Colchester and District Sunday League.

== Governance ==
Great Oakley is part of the electoral ward called Great and Little Oakley. The ward population at the 2011 census was 2,188.

== Nearby places ==
| Wrabness | Ramsey | Harwich |
| Wix | Great Oakley | Little Oakley |
| Tendring | Beaumont-cum-Moze | Walton-on-the-Naze |

== Notable people ==
James Cockle, a surgeon and father of mathematician and first Chief Justice of Queensland Sir James Cockle.
