= Killila =

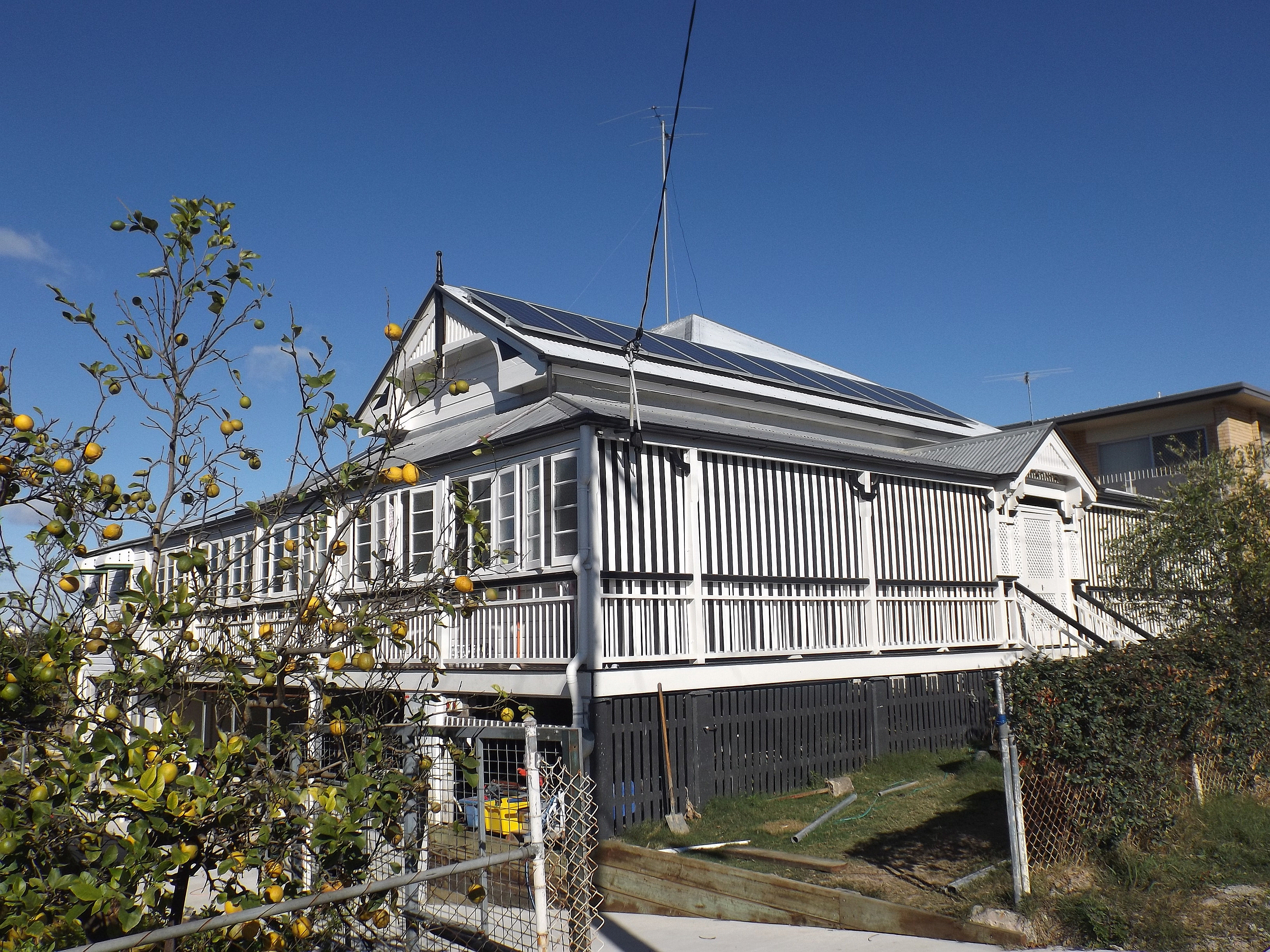
- Residence in 2015

- Location within Queensland Location within Australia
- 27.4261°S 153.0361°E
- Location: 100 Stoneleigh Street, Lutwyche, City of Brisbane, Queensland, Australia

History
- Design period: 1870s - 1890s (late 19th century)
- Built: c. 1885

Queensland Heritage Register
- Official name: Killila, Killila Cottage
- Type: state heritage (built)
- Designated: 1 October 2003
- Reference no.: 602070
- Significant period: 1880s-1910s (fabric); 1880s-1930s (historical)
- Significant components: residential accommodation - main house, kitchen/kitchen house, furniture/fittings

Killila is a heritage-listed detached house at 100 Stoneleigh Street, Lutwyche, City of Brisbane, Queensland, Australia. It was built c. 1885. It is also known as Killila Cottage. It was added to the Queensland Heritage Register on 1 October 2003.

== History ==
Killila is a timber house, erected as a working class cottage c. 1885, with extensive early 20th century alterations to convert it into a substantial middle-class home.

The allotment on which this residence is situated was first alienated in 1858 as Portion 155, parish of Enoggera, county of Stanley (20 acres (8.1 ha)), by James Baker, a compositor of Brisbane, at a cost of £79. Five years later, the title was transferred to Robert Cribb, a Brisbane broker. Cribb immediately set about subdividing the land and in November 1880 title to subdivisions 11–22 and 51–56 of portion 155, comprising just over 7 acres (2.8 ha), was registered in the name of John Lloyd Bale.

Bale was an accountant, agent and broker, and at the time of purchasing these Albion subdivisions was serving as Chairman of the Ithaca Divisional Board. He was elected a Member of the Queensland Legislative Assembly in 1883 and remained in that position until his death in 1885. He resided in an 1860s house at the corner of Albion and Bowen Bridge (Lutwyche) Roads named Stoneleigh, which gave its name to Stoneleigh Street. Most of Bale's land in the Albion/Windsor area remained unimproved, and between 1882 and 1884 he re-subdivided the property as the Stoneleigh Estate.

In May 1883, title to re-subdivisions 56 and 57 of subdivision 56, comprising an area of 32 perches (810 m^{2}) (the site of Killila Cottage) was transferred to Elizabeth Parsons, the wife of George Alfred Parsons, brickmaker. Parsons was based at Lutwyche at this period, and it is unlikely that he lived in Stoneleigh Street, Albion. However, the Post Office Directories record Robert Parsons, brickmaker, as resident in Albion in the period 1885 to 1887, and it is possible that a cottage had been erected at 100 Stoneleigh Street by 1885, perhaps occupied by Robert Parsons. Certainly the cottage was constructed before the property was sold early in 1888 to the next owner, Mrs Margaret Duhig, widow and mother of James Duhig (1871–1965), the prominent Roman Catholic Archbishop of Brisbane between 1917 and 1965.

Margaret Duhig emigrated from Ireland to Brisbane, following a sojourn in England, with James and two of her other children on 8 April 1885, aboard the Mackara. Two other children followed later. For 3 years the Duhigs were unable to afford to purchase their own house in Brisbane and resided in rental properties in Paddington, Spring Hill and Petrie Terrace before purchasing the cottage at 100 Stoneleigh Street. When James Duhig joined the work force in 1885, aged nearly 14, his weekly wage was one of the solid bases of the family economy and his support contributed to the deposit paid on the Stoneleigh Street cottage.

Although title to the Stoneleigh Street property was not registered in the name of Margaret Duhig until February 1889, and the Post Office Directories first record her as resident in Albion in that year, personal letters in the Brisbane Catholic Archdiocesan Archives indicate that the Duhigs were residing at Albion by early 1888. On 26 April of that year, James Duhig wrote to his brother, Martin, announcing the family's purchase of the property for £250 and expressing a hope that it "could double our money at any time". Three months later, Margaret Duhig wrote to Martin explaining that she was paying 8% interest and that extensions were carried out to the house for a sum of £40. For the Duhigs, it was a modest family house, affectionately named Killila Cottage after their home in County Limerick, Ireland.

By the mid-1880s Windsor shire was an ideal suburban location, being within a stone's throw of the city yet enjoying all the attributes of the country. The Duhigs' neighbours in Stoneleigh Street, who in 1892 included a prominent draper, 2 accountants, an auctioneer, an engineer, several clerical workers, and numerous tradesmen and semi-skilled workers, reflected the growing eclectic social milieu of the Albion/Windsor area in the late 19th century, with more affluent residents building substantial homes on the higher ground and the working class in the valleys in between.

It was during his residence at Killara Cottage that James Duhig began thinking seriously about a theological career. In 1890, after nearly five years of clerical work for the Co-operative Butchery Company, he returned to the Christian Brothers' Gregory Terrace School as a day student to study Latin and French with a view to furthering his theological interests. He also became an active member of the Catholic community, joining the Catholic Young Men's Society and serving as a parish catechist in Wooloowin. After 5 years of religious study in Rome, Duhig was ordained a priest in 1896 and returned to Brisbane the following year. Rising through the ranks of the Catholic Church, he succeeded Robert Dunne as Archbishop of Brisbane in 1917. Duhig's commitment helped raise the profile and status of Catholicism in Queensland, but he was also an influential figure in the State's social, political and economic activities. Duhig used his public profile to advance issues such as education, urban development, artistic development, justice and land settlement. As the driving force behind some 400 major buildings, including religious, educational, medical and charitable institutions, "James the Builder" also left his mark on the physical structure of Brisbane.

When James Duhig embarked for Rome in 1891 to study for the priesthood, the family faced precarious financial circumstances. In the early 1890s, the mortgage repayments on Killara Cottage had stretched the family's budget and when Margaret Duhig contemplated selling she was reputedly unable to find a buyer, ironically having passed up an offer in 1889 from the Windsor Shire Council to purchase and resume the property to open up Salt Street.

Despite the financial difficulties, Margaret Duhig retained ownership of the property until her death in 1902. It was then transferred to her daughters, Mary and Ellen Duhig, before it was registered in 1908 solely in the name of Mary Duhig, who retained title to the property for the next 29 years. Ellen joined the Order of the Good Samaritans, and Mary never married. By 1904 their sister Elizabeth and her husband Francis Joseph Cullen, had moved into Killila Cottage, where they raised their family. The Cullens resided here until 1937, and reputedly it was during their occupancy that substantial additions and renovations were made to the house. Mortgages on the property taken out in 1903 for £300 and in 1913 for £500 may be an indication of the date/s of the alterations, but this has yet to be confirmed. The Cullen and Duhig families appear to have been very close. One of James Duhig's nephews, Frank Lee Cullen, became a well-known Brisbane architect in the late 1930s, and undertook a number of commissions for the Catholic Church.

In 1937, title to the property was transferred to Edgar Luke Samuel Pilkington, and it has remained in the Pilkington family since. Brisbane City Council records indicate that the house has not been substantially altered since at least 1946, with additions limited to construction of a single detached garage in 1961 and a tennis court on what is now a separate property at 98 Stoneleigh Street.

Killila was sold in 2011 for $845,000.

== Description ==
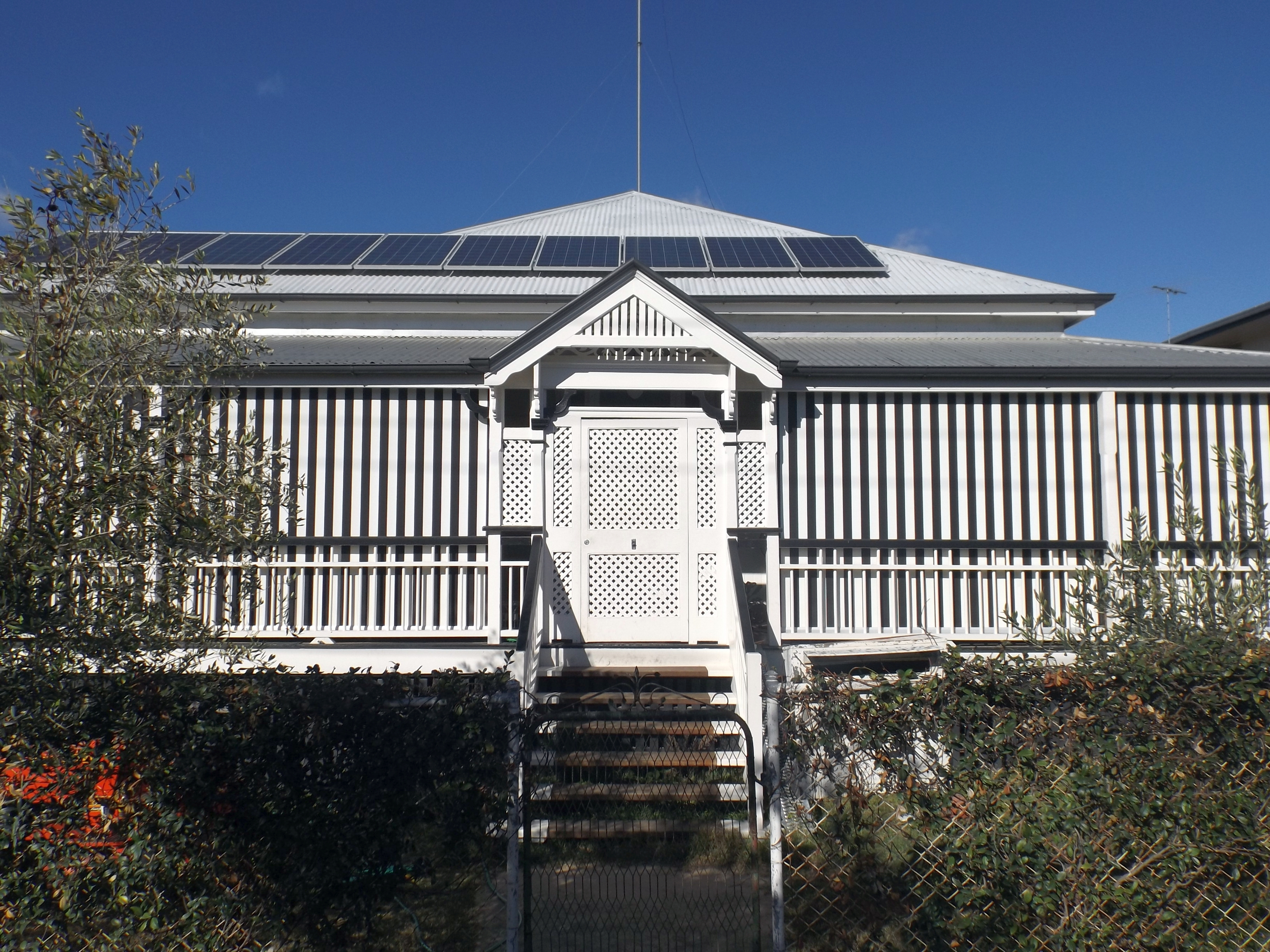
Entrance, 2015

Killila is located on two allotments at 100 Stoneleigh Street, Windsor, north of the Brisbane city centre. They are each 405 square metres (4,360 sq ft) with the rear of the allotments also accessed from Salt Street. The property is located amidst a number of late 20th century brick unit blocks in this part of Stoneleigh Street.

The single-storey, high-set timber residence is sited close to the Stoneleigh Street boundary and the entire property perimeter is enclosed with a wire fence. There is vehicular access to the site from both Stoneleigh and Salt streets; however, only the Stoneleigh Street entrance gives access to a driveway leading to the garage situated on the eastern side of the property.

The timber-framed house appears to have been constructed or reconstructed in at least three stages. A hipped-roof attached kitchen wing at the rear appears to be the oldest section of the house, likely part of the c. 1885 cottage. The core of the residence, which appears to be of mostly early 20th century fabric, has a short-ridged hipped roof of corrugated iron, and possibly replaces the earlier cottage core. It has early 20th century additions, comprising a gabled, east-facing projection at the front, and enlarged eastern side verandah, and rear additions. There are stepped verandahs with a skillion roof on three sides. All roofs are clad in corrugated iron and a corbelled brick chimneystack protrudes from above the kitchen.

The front verandah has been enclosed with timber louvres and the original dowel balustrading is covered by fibrous cement panels. The original square verandah posts with tapered chamfers, have simple capital and astragal embellishments, and are visible in the front facade. Entry to the front verandah is gained via a short flight of later concrete stairs and through a single lattice door. A flying gable above the entry has decorative fretwork fronted by a simple slat infill and bargeboard. The side verandahs have also been enclosed with hinged windows. The formerly exposed face of the eastern gable, now hidden by the side verandah in-fill, has 8-inch (200 mm) deep chamferboards, which may have been recycled from elsewhere in the house.

The exposed faces of the rear extension are clad in chamferboards with some sections in vertically jointed tongue and groove boarding. A flight of timber stairs to the rear wing of the house is sheltered by a corrugated iron roof. All windows in the rear extension are hinged and those facing south from the dining room feature coloured glass inserts. The majority of rooms with windows to the rear of the house are protected by hoods. Two distinct styles of hood are present, with some featuring galvanised skillion roofs and timber batten sides and other hoods featuring a convex profile with star motif on the sides typical of inter-war sunhood design.

The original timber stumps of the house have been replaced with concrete and the sub-floor has been enclosed with timber battens. The area directly beneath the kitchen wing currently functions as a storage area and has an early brick fireplace which shares a chimney with the kitchen fireplace above.

The early front door is centrally positioned in the front facade of what appears to be the first stage of the core. It has a cast iron knocker, central door knob, fielded panels and bolection moulds, and opens to a wide hallway which extends the length of the core. It is divided about mid-way along by a slatted timber arch. Six rooms open off this hallway, three to the left and two to the right. Above each doorway is a pivoted fanlight with waxed paper inserts. The first room to the left is the main bedroom, formerly a parlour, with a large double-hung sash window opening to the front verandah. It has a very fine pressed metal ceiling in Art Nouveau pattern. The second and third rooms on the left are currently used as bedrooms with French doors opening to the eastern side verandah. The front room on the right hand side has a bay window with double-hung windows to the front facade and French doors opening to the side verandah. The partition between the second and third rooms on the right has been removed to create one large living room, divided by a timber screen. This area has a fireplace with a fine timber surround in the southern wall, which backs onto the fireplace the adjoining kitchen. What was formerly the third room on this side of the hallway has also been extended onto what was formerly part of the western side verandah. The door opening into this room has early glass paneling.

The far end of the hallway opens into an enclosed and extended former verandah area at the rear of the house, which is now used as a dining room and which appears to be an early 1900s extension. To the left is a bathroom and to the right is the kitchen and pantry. The kitchen retains the original wood oven and the former external walls of the kitchen wing are clad in a wider timber profile than the other walls in the house. Beside the pantry is a toilet, and adjacent to this a flight of timber stairs leading to the backyard.

The walls in the core are mainly single-skin, constructed of narrow, vertically jointed tongue and groove boarding. The ceilings, with the exclusion of the pressed metal ceiling in the front northeastern room, are lined with the same boarding. All rooms off the hallway have high picture rails and lambs tongue skirting boards. Joinery in the hallway, including the doors, is decorated with an early timber graining effect.

== Heritage listing ==
Killila was listed on the Queensland Heritage Register on 1 October 2003 having satisfied the following criteria.

The place is important in demonstrating the evolution or pattern of Queensland's history.

Killila was constructed c. 1885 as a much smaller cottage, which was substantially refurbished and extended early in the 20th century. It is important in demonstrating the evolution or pattern of Queensland's history, illustrating in its fabric the pattern of upward social mobility from worker's cottage to middle-class residence, which characterized the struggle of Irish immigrants in Queensland to succeed in their new country and to raise the status of Catholics in an Anglican-dominated society.

The place is important in demonstrating the principal characteristics of a particular class of cultural places.

The house is important in illustrating the principal characteristics of a generously sized middle-class residence of the early 20th century. The interior in particular is remarkably intact, including the internal layout, fabric, and finishes – such as early graining to the joinery and wall and floor finishes, patterned wax papers on the transom lights over the internal doors, and c. 1920s electric light shades.

The place is important because of its aesthetic significance.

The place makes an important aesthetic contribution to the historical townscape of Windsor, which abounds in 19th and early 20th century residences, and contributes significantly to the historical character of the local area.

The place has a special association with the life or work of a particular person, group or organisation of importance in Queensland's history.

The house is also significant for its association with James Duhig (1871–1965), the prominent Queensland Catholic Archbishop from 1917 to 1965. During his religious career, Duhig helped raise the status of Catholicism in Queensland and played an influential role in the social, economic and political issues facing the State from the 1920s to the 1950s. As a youth, Duhig resided at Killila Cottage at Stoneleigh Street for several years before embarking for Rome to study for the priesthood. It was during his time at the Windsor residence that he first became actively involved in the Brisbane Catholic community. The house remained in the Duhig family for close to 50 years, during which time it was transformed into a middle-class residence.
