= Gordon Park, Queensland =

Gordon Park
- Suburb
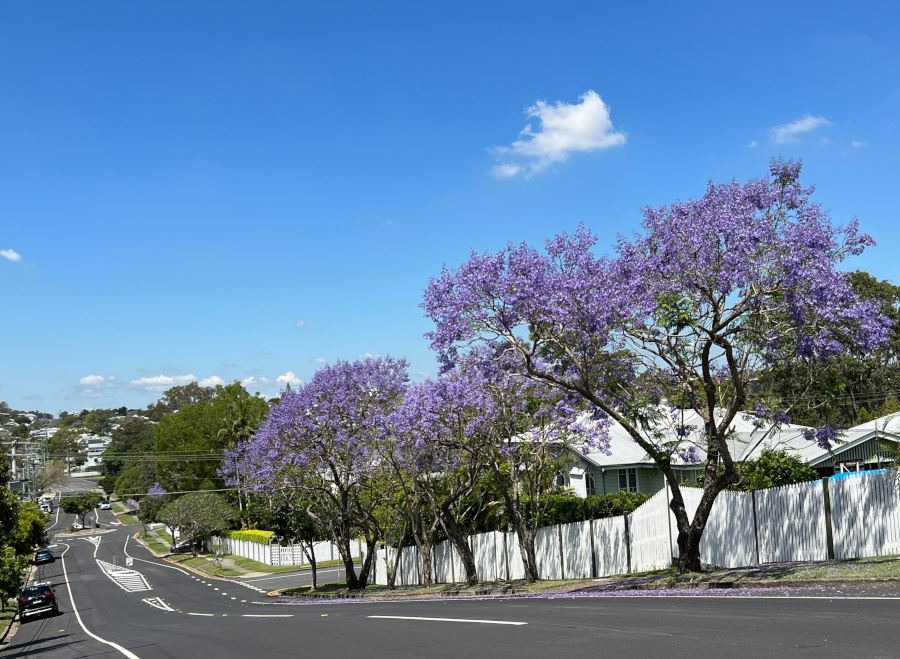
- Jacarandas in full bloom, Gordon Park, 2021

- Interactive map of Gordon Park
- Coordinates: 27.4163°S 153.0330°E
- Country: Australia
- State: Queensland
- City: Brisbane
- LGA: City of Brisbane (Marchant Ward)
- Location: 5.1 km (3.2 mi) N of Brisbane CBD
- Established: 1880s

Government
  - State electorate: Clayfield
  - Federal division: Brisbane

Area
  - Total: 1.2 km^{2} (0.46 sq mi)

Population
  - Total: 4,390 (2021 census)
  - Density: 3,660/km^{2} (9,500/sq mi)
- Time zone: UTC+10:00 (AEST)
- Postcode: 4031
Suburbs around Gordon Park
Stafford	Kedron	Kedron
Stafford	Gordon Park	Lutwyche
Grange	Lutwyche	Lutwyche

Gordon Park is a northern suburb in the City of Brisbane, Queensland, Australia. In the 2021 census, Gordon Park had a population of 4,390 people.

== Geography ==
Gordon Park is located 5.4 kilometres (3.4 mi) from the Brisbane CBD and is bordered by Kedron Brook to the east and south, and Stafford Road to the north.

Gordon Park shares an Australia Post postcode of 4031 with neighbouring suburb Kedron.

== History ==
The suburb was named after General Gordon who was the hero of the eight-month siege of Khartoum in the Sudan in the late 19th century. Most of the street names in the suburb relate to General Gordon, the armies he served with, and their sphere of operation (for example, Gordon Street, Khartoum Street, and Baker Street).

The Gordon Estate – Lutwyche of 264 blocks went to auction on 25 September 1886.

The Metropolitan Freehold Land and Building Company Limited advertised Gordon Park Estate for auction on 13 December 1890. It consisted of 1063 allotments (mostly of 16 to 20 perches). This estate was bounded by Stafford Road to the north, Gordon Street to the east, Kedron Brook to the south and Burnaby Street (now Burnaby Terrace) to the west, encompassing almost all of the present day suburb except for the south-western corner. However, the auctioneer G.T. Bell only sold 73 lots for an average price of £26 3s 7d (total £1,2917 10s).

On 27 March 1920, auctioneers Cameron Brothers offered 61 allotments in the south-west of the current suburb in the area of Granville Terrace (now Bedford Street), Aberdeen Terrace and Thistle Street (these did not form part of the 1890 subdivision). In June 1920, the auctioneers offered further blocks to the south of the March 1920 sales, in the area of Granville Terrace (now Bedford Street), Stirling Street and Montrose Street.

On 18 September 1920, auctioneers Isles, Love & Co offered 150 allotments in the Glenkedron South Estate Section 2 (in the north-east of the current suburb). The allotments were in First Avenue (now Suez Street), Second Avenue (now Swan Street), Third Avenue (now Goulburn Street), Fourth Avenue (now Jack Street), Fifth Avenue (now Barron Street) and Seventh Avenue (now Rose Lane).

On 6 May 1922, auctioneers Cameron Brothers offered 98 allotments for sale in the north-west of the current suburb in the area of Main Happy Valley Road (Stafford Road), Haig Street, Burnaby Street (now Burnaby Terrace), Turner Road (now Alva Terrace) and Victoria Terrace. These were part of the ninth second of the Gordon Park estate that had been first offered in 1890.

On 11 November 1922, auctioneers Cameron Brothers offered 47 allotments in Section 1A of the Glen Park estate (as first offered in 1890). These allotments were in the area of Cowper Street, Hill Street (now Highland Street), Beaconsfield Terrace, Richmond Street and Khartoum Street.

On 8 December 1923, auctioneers Cameron Brothers offered 45 home sites in the area of Granville Terrace (now Bedford Street), Aberdeen Terrace and Thistle Street.

On 10 May 1924, auctioneers Isles, Love & Co offered 24 remaining allotments in the Glenkedron South Estate in the north-east of the current suburb, which had been previously offered at auction in September 1920. All 24 allotments were sold.

In 1924, the Realty Development Company were selling suburban blocks (ranging from 16 to 20 perches) in the Tramway Extension Estate. This estate was bounded by Stafford Road to the north and Hill Street (now Highland Street) to the south and included Burnaby Street (now Burnaby Terrace), Turner Road (now Alva Terrace) and Victoria Terrace (and was part of the estate that was first offered in 1890 and again in 1922).

In 1926, the Gordon Park Baptist Church started as a tent mission on property at Khartoum Street which was owned by the church. It was originally known as the Gordon Park Mission Church. On 27 March 1926, a church building was officially opened on the corner of Khartoum and Hamilton Streets in the Grove Park Estate (approx 27.4174°S 153.0275°E). The church rented a house, which became the home of the pastors on the corner of Groom and Thistle Streets until a manse was purchased and officially opened on 9 May 1953. The President of the Baptist Union of Queensland opened the church hall in 1961. A new church at 106 Khartoum Street (27.4171°S 153.0277°E) opened on 10 September 1977. The original pulpit from the old church along with a communion tray was donated to the Beenleigh Baptist Church.

On 28 July 1929, Archbishop James Duhig laid the foundation stone of a new Catholic church and school. He returned to bless and open the new church and school on 3 November 1929. The building was on two levels with the school on the lower level with a capacity of 200 students and the church on the upper level with a capacity of 250 people. The intention was that a new larger church would be built later and the school occupy both levels of the original building. St Carthage's Catholic Primary School opened on 8 July 1930; it was operated by the Sisters of Mercy. On 26 June 1966, the present brick church facing Beaconsfield Terrace was opened by Archbishop Patrick O’Donnell. The new buildings were designed by architects Corbett and Ryan and cost over $92,000, including furnishings. In November 1974, the Sisters of Mercy ceased to staff the school apart from one Sister for religious instruction. It was one of the first of the schools in the Brisbane Archdiocese to transition to lay control under headmaster Edward Benito Pender. However, the school was closed by the archdiocese in 1976 as it was felt that the enrolment of 86 students was insufficient to make the school financially viable.

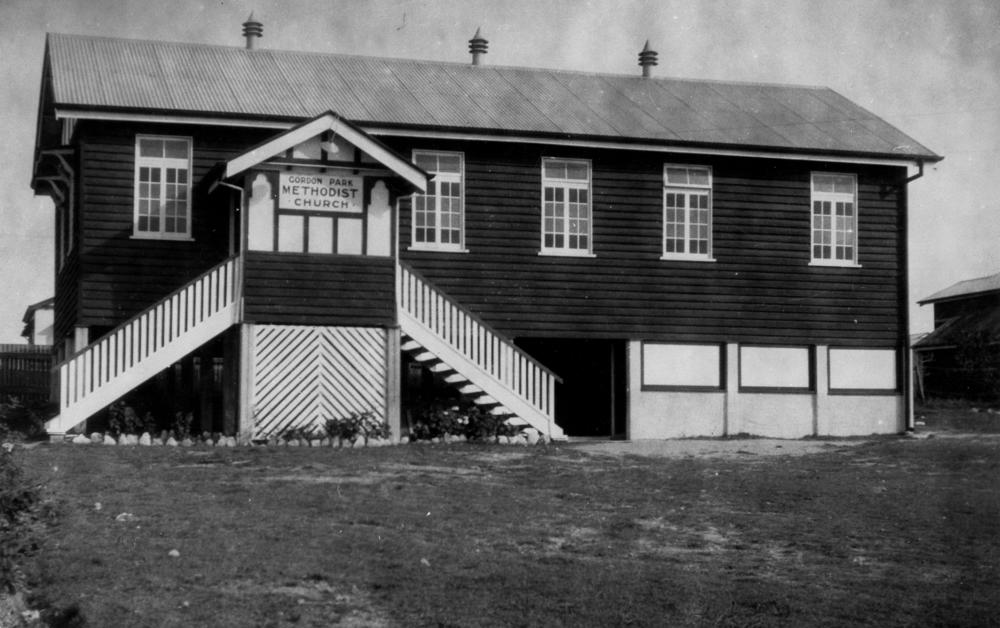
Gordon Park Methodist Church, 1931

On Saturday 19 October 1929, a site in Beaconsfield Terrace (near the junction with Cowper Street, approx 27.4146°S 153.0259°E) was dedicated for a future Methodist church. On Saturday 20 September 1930 there was a stump capping ceremony as construction commenced on the church hall building. The hall was officially opened on Saturday 1 November 1930.

In November 1938, the Brisbane City Council announced that the tram to Gordon Park would be extended from Lutwyche Road via Bradshaw Street, crossing Kedron Brook into Thistle Street. Trams ran to Gordon Park connecting it with Brisbane until they were progressively withdrawn from use, finally ceasing all operations in Brisbane on 13 April 1969.

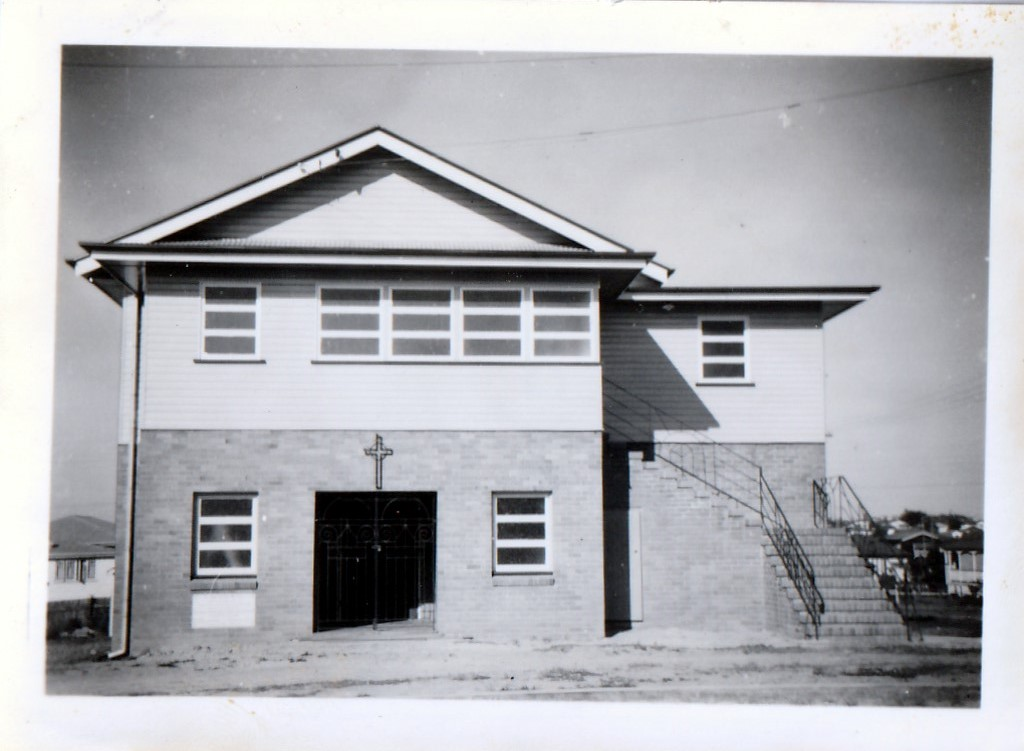
Newly built St John's Anglican Church in Khartoum Street

St John's Anglican Church on the corner of Khartoum Street and Cowper Street (approx 27.4150°S 153.0280°E) was dedicated on 2 August 1959 by Archbishop Reginald Halse. Its closure on 15 March 1987 was approved by Assistant Bishop George Browning.

On 11 August 1975, Gordon Park ceased to be a separate suburb. However residents lobbied against this decision and, on 18 December 1992, Gordon Park was reinstated as a suburb.

== Demographics ==
In the 2016 census, Gordon Park had a population of 4,231 people.

In the 2021 census, Gordon Park had a population of 4,853 people, 51.5% female and 48.5% male. The median age of the Gordon Park population was 36 years of age, 2 years below the Australian median age at 38 years. 77.3% (3.4 rise from 2016) of people living in Gordon Park were born in Australia, compared to the national average of 66.9%; the next most common countries of birth were England 3.1% and New Zealand 2.7%. 86.2% of people spoke only English at home; the next most popular languages were 1.4% Italian, 1.3% Spanish, and 1.0% Mandarin.

== Heritage listings ==
Gordon Park has a number of heritage-listed sites, including:

- former St Carthage's Catholic School building, 29 Aberdeen Terrace (27.4179°S 153.0246°E)
- Alexander Barron's house, 29 Jack Street (27.4141°S 153.0316°E)

== Education ==
There are no schools in Gordon Park. The nearest government primary schools are in Stafford, Wooloowin and Kedron. The nearest government secondary school is Kedron State High School.

== Amenities ==
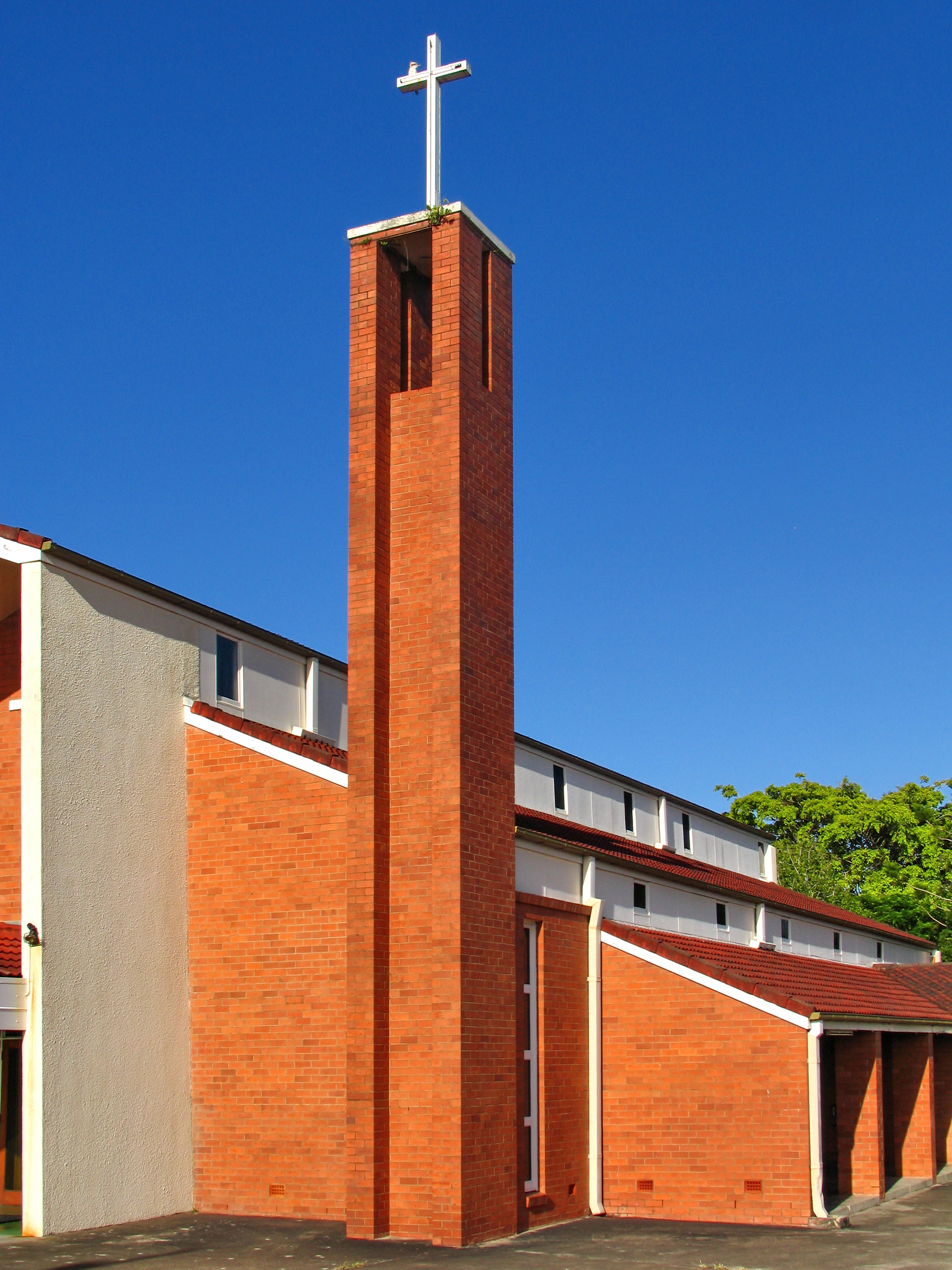
Carthage's Catholic Church, 2007

St Carthage's Catholic Church is at 115 Beaconsfield Terrace (27.4175°S 153.0252°E).

=== Parks ===
There are a number of parks, including:

- Amelia Park (27.4162°S 153.0332°E)
- Archer Street Park (27.4217°S 153.0249°E)
- Gordon Park Playground Park (27.4143°S 153.0276°E)
- Hickey Park (27.4151°S 153.0203°E)
- Kokoda Park (27.4218°S 153.0277°E)
- Montrose Street Park (27.4216°S 153.0238°E)
- Thistle Street Park (no.74) (27.4206°S 153.0311°E)
- Wally Bourke Park (27.4214°S 153.0296°E)

== Notable residents ==
Gordon Park resident, Thomas Charles Nash, was born in Essex, England in 1909. He emigrated to Australia at the age of 17 aboard the S.S. Vedic, a ship chartered by the Salvation Army to bring 700 young emigrants to Australia. He was awarded the Order of Australia in 1985 in recognition of his service to the local community. Prior to receiving the award he had received a certificate of merit for services to the incapacitated Servicemen's Association, a RSL certificate of merit, honorary life membership of the RSL and the Paul Harris Fellowship medal from Rotary International. Tom Nash had also been a Brisbane City Council councillor.
