= Conon, Lutwyche =

Conon
- Location within Queensland Location within Australia
- 27.4245°S 153.036°E
- Location: 29 Conon Street, Lutwyche, City of Brisbane, Queensland, Australia

History
- Design period: 1840s - 1860s (mid-19th century)
- Built: 1863

Queensland Heritage Register
- Official name: Conon
- Type: state heritage (landscape, built)
- Designated: 21 October 1992
- Reference no.: 600346
- Significant period: 1860s-1930s (fabric); 1860s-1950s (historical)
- Significant components: cellar, garden/grounds, residential accommodation - main house, service wing

Conon is a heritage-listed detached house at 29 Conon Street, Lutwyche, City of Brisbane, Queensland, Australia. It was built in 1863. It was added to the Queensland Heritage Register on 21 October 1992.

== History ==
This low-set masonry and timber residence was constructed in a number of stages, with the brick and stone core dating to 1863.

Originally the site was part of a 10-acre (4.0 ha) subdivision acquired by Robert Cribb, Brisbane politician and property dealer, in 1861. In 1863, Cribb sold this to fellow Scottish immigrant Kenneth McLennan, a stonemason from the town of Conon in Scotland, who had arrived in Brisbane in 1855. On the transfer document, McLennan listed his occupation as builder, and his descendants believe that McLennan built the house himself in 1863.

In 1878, McLennan raised a £300 mortgage on the property from Brisbane land speculator James Gibbon, which may have financed the addition of a northern brick and stone wing to the house about this time.

By the early 1890s, the property included an orchard and vineyard, bowling green, tennis court, stables and various outbuildings. bunya pines lined the front drive, which is now Conon Street, down to McLennan Street.

Around 1900, a timber extension was added to the southern side of the kitchen, and two internal walls were removed in 1917 to create a larger bedroom.

At Conon, McLennan and his wife Ann Grant, whom he had married at Ipswich in 1855, raised a family of ten children. McLennan appears to have derived his Queensland income from property dealing rather than building. He took a keen interest in church and community affairs, and served as a Windsor Shire councillor and as the first mayor of the Town of Windsor in 1904.

Following the death of his wife in 1912, McLennan moved from Conon and died at New Farm, aged eighty-seven years, on 1 November 1916.

While a small allotment was excised from the original allotment in 1895 it was only after McLennan's death that his sons subdivided the original estate retaining for the family two allotments totaling 2 acres (0.81 ha) 3 roods 14 perches (3,400 m^{2}) containing the house and its garden, the tennis court and bowling green.

The house block remained in the McLennan family until 1934, when it was sold to Sir Neil O'Sullivan, a Brisbane solicitor and federal cabinet minister. The northern allotment remained in the family until 1947. The O'Sullivans added a brick bedroom off the southern verandah in 1935.

Lady O'Sullivan sold the property in 1972, but it remains a family residence. In 1980, a larger brick bedroom wing was added at the rear.

== Description ==
Conon occupies a hilltop position in Lutwyche overlooking Breakfast Creek. It is a low-set masonry and timber residence which, because of its evolutionary nature, employs a variety of materials and styles.

The earliest section of the house comprises a three-roomed (formerly four) brick core with a timber verandah which formerly encircled the whole. It rests on a rubble foundation of Brisbane tuff which was collected from the property, and is capped by a galvanised iron roof which was shingled originally.

Portions of the verandah survive at the front, southern side and at the rear, and were either conserved or reconstructed in 1987. Dowel balustrading, square timber posts and fretwork brackets of an unusual thistle pattern supply the exterior decoration to this section.

A small cellar is located under the side verandah and a separate basement cellar lies beneath the two early bedrooms.

No visible evidence remains of any early kitchen house, probably timber, associated with the 1863 building.

The rendered brick northern wing with coursed stone foundations and a corrugated iron roof was added in the late 1870s. It comprises an entrance hall, two large sitting rooms (probably formerly drawing and dining rooms) which are divided by an unadorned archway, and a large former kitchen, maid's room and pantry at the rear. Each sitting room has a bay window which also is separated from the body of the room by an arch.

The grounds have been reduced following subdivisions however sufficient has been retained to preserve its garden and sense of space reflecting a 19th-century ambience. Despite the subdivision of the original holding, the garden setting of the house is important in the understanding and appreciation of the significance of the place and its long history.

Within the grounds there is a sense of isolation from more recent development. Some early plantings and garden features from the mid 19th century remain and indeed the general arrangement of the early garden is reflected in more recent plantings of the 1970s and 1980s.

The association with the McLennan family for almost seventy years is perpetuated in the names of the neighbouring streets: McLennan, Kenneth and Conon.

== Heritage listing ==
Conon was listed on the Queensland Heritage Register on 21 October 1992 having satisfied the following criteria.

The place is important in demonstrating the evolution or pattern of Queensland's history.

Conon is significant historically as one of the earliest houses in the Lutwyche area demonstrating the housing type of that time and of first wave of residential construction in the area. Evidence of later changes and additions to the house are clearly apparent in the surviving fabric.

The place demonstrates rare, uncommon or endangered aspects of Queensland's cultural heritage.

Conon has significance as a rare survivor of an 1860s house with an early garden in Brisbane. The scale of the garden and the setting of the house within the more recent suburban fabric of Lutwyche adds to that significance.

The place is important in demonstrating the principal characteristics of a particular class of cultural places.

The early core provides important evidence of mid-19th century masonry construction. In its present form it exemplifies the evolving house, extending from a modest mid-19th century core into a substantial late-19th century residence, with a cohesive and intact front facade. The changes reflect the changing fortunes and expectations of its original and later owners.

The place is important because of its aesthetic significance.

Conon sits within a substantial garden which makes a major contribution to the aesthetic significance of the place. The site is surrounded by later suburban houses but the house and its garden retain a nineteenth century ambiance. More recent development is not apparent from within the site and outward views are protected.

The place has a special association with the life or work of a particular person, group or organisation of importance in Queensland's history.

Conon is significant for its association for almost 70 years with the McLennan family, who played an important role in the development of Brisbane in the second half of the 19th century and for its later association with Neil O'Sullivan, at one time Federal Attorney General.
