= Albion Fire Station =

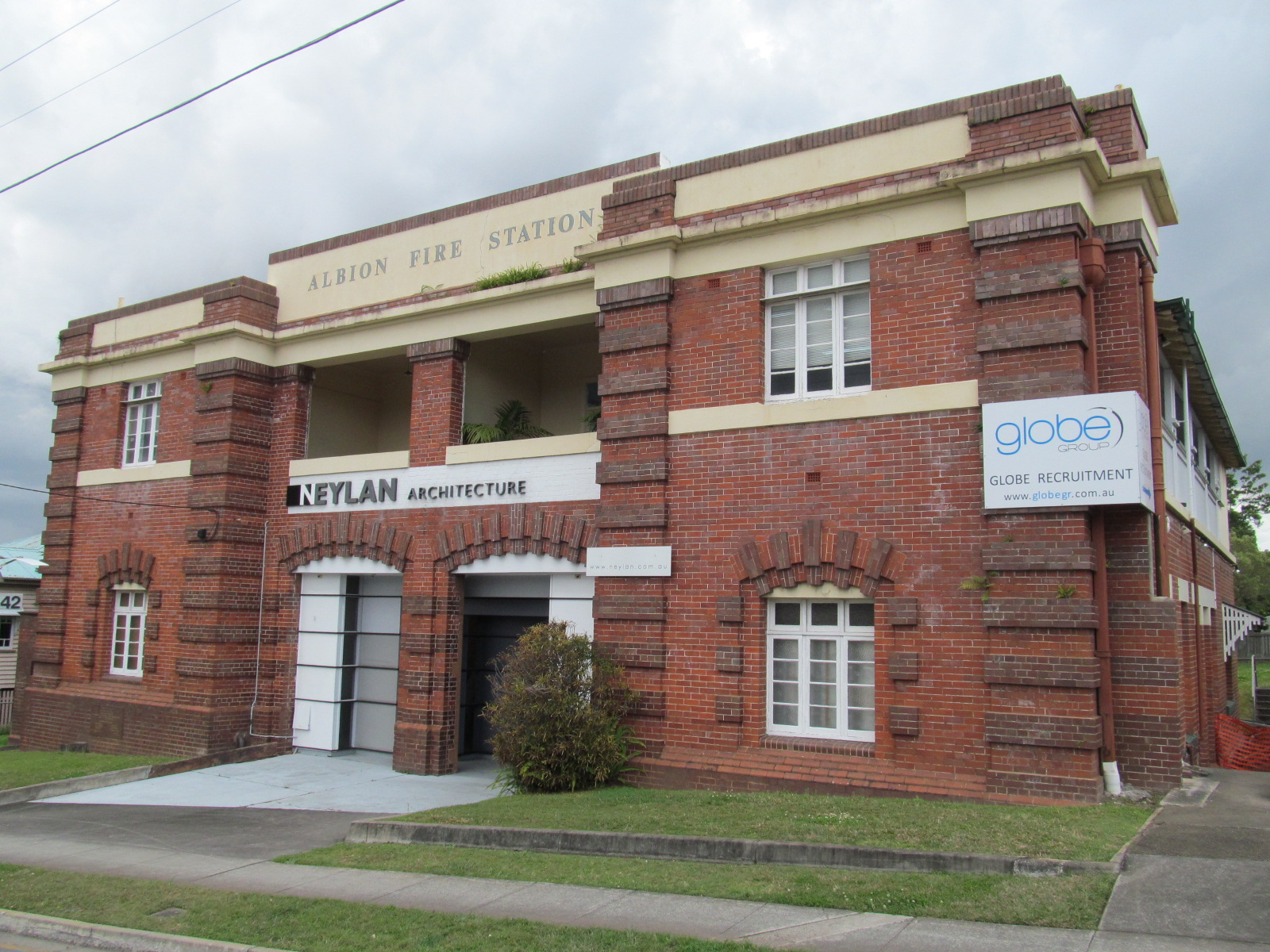
- Former Albion Fire Station, 2013

- Location within Queensland Location within Australia
- 27.4253°S 153.0417°E
- Location: 42 Bridge Street, Wooloowin, City of Brisbane, Queensland, Australia

History
- Design period: 1919–1930s (interwar period)
- Built: 1925–1927

Site notes
- Architect: Department of Public Works
- Architectural style: Classicism

Queensland Heritage Register
- Official name: Albion Fire Station (former), Albion Fire Station
- Type: state heritage (built)
- Designated: 28 February 2003
- Reference no.: 602246
- Significant period: 1920s (historical); 1920s–1930s (fabric)
- Significant components: residential accommodation – fire officer's house/quarters, gate – entrance, loggia/s, fire station, garden/grounds

Albion Fire Station is a heritage-listed former fire station at 42 Bridge Street, Wooloowin, City of Brisbane, Queensland, Australia. It was designed by Department of Public Works and built from 1925 to 1927. It was added to the Queensland Heritage Register on 28 February 2003.

== History ==
The former Albion Fire Station is a substantial two-storey red brick building standing prominently on Bridge Street (now in Wooloowin but formerly in Albion). It was officially opened on Monday 17 January 1927 when the Home Secretary James Stopford pulled a rope which automatically swung the doors open, rang the alarm and roused the firemen to action, and the two fire engines raced out of the station. The guests were very impressed at the demonstration of the speed with which the station could respond to an emergency.

Designed by the Department of Public Works, the building was the major and coordinating fire station for the Brisbane northside area. Its sister station at South Brisbane (corner Main and Vulture Streets, Woolloongabba), opened in September 1927 and also designed by the Department of Public Works, was the major and coordinating fire station for Brisbane southside area. Prior to this, the only other substantial brick fire station buildings were the two buildings constructed as Brisbane Fire Brigade Headquarters – firstly to the corner Ann and Edward Streets (architect Henry Wallace Atkinson, 1890) which was replaced by a new building further north in Ann Street (architect Henry Wallace Atkinson and Charles McLay, 1908). Generally fire stations were small timber buildings, often only sheds or garages. The former Albion Fire Station is the only survivor from this group of substantial brick buildings. The first Brisbane Headquarters was demolished in 1951 and the second in the mid-1980s to make way for Cathedral Square. The South Brisbane Fire Station was decommissioned in 1971 and demolished in the mid-1980s.

From 1860 a number of attempts were made to establish a fire brigade for Brisbane but it was not until 1889 that a permanent fire brigade was established. To cope with the fire fighting needs of the expanding city, the Fire Brigades Act Amendment Act 1902 allowed local authorities to establish independent boards and brigades. Brigades were formed in Hamilton (1917), Windsor (1917), Ithaca (1918), Toowong (1918), Taringa (1919), Wynnum (1921) and Sandgate (1923). These were voluntary bodies with only the superintendent and immediate assistants receiving a salary. The Fire Brigades Act 1920 rationalised the network of fire brigades in Brisbane city and suburbs, centralising control under the Metropolitan Fire Brigades Board in 1921.

The former Albion Fire Station replaced the Windsor Fire Station which was established under the Fire Brigades Act Amendment Act 1902 in 1917 and located on land that is now an extension of Truro Street, Windsor. Following the amalgamation of fire brigades in 1921, the Metropolitan Fire Brigades Board purchased the Bridge Street site for a new Windsor Fire Station. When constructed it became known as the Albion Fire Station and remained in operation until 1961 when it was replaced by a new Windsor Fire Station to the corner of Fosbery and Truro Streets, Windsor.

The costs of the construction of the fire stations at Albion and South Brisbane was unable to be funded by the Queensland Treasury and a loan from the Commonwealth Bank was negotiated. The loan for £35,000 over 25 years was covered by debentures bearing interest at 6% government guaranteed. The Albion Fire Station was the smaller station and cost £9,978.

The original drawings for the former Albion Fire Station have not been located, but the annual report for the Department of Public Works (year ended 1926) recorded that the building was to be constructed of brick and concrete and accommodate the brigade facilities on the ground floor. These facilities included garage space for two fire engines with a repair shop and pit at the rear and an access yard at the back. There was a rest room or dormitory for nine persons and a billiard room taking a full-sized table. Other rooms on the ground floor included a mess room, kitchen, pantry, locker room, watch room, battery room, equipment store and district officer's room with private bathroom and lavatory. A flat concrete roof was to cover the whole building and accommodate laundries.

A later drawing (1960) shows two flats (one to the north, one to the south) for brigade officers occupied the upper storey. Each flat had an entrance porch at ground level, internal access to the ground floor station and provided front and side verandahs, kitchen, pantry, bathroom, living room and bedrooms.

In 2003, the ground floor accommodated the office of an architectural firm and the upper floor was occupied by the Queensland Family History Society. The fabric of the building has been altered to accommodate these uses but the earlier arrangement of spaces as a fire station can be clearly read and appreciated.

In 2014, Neylan Architecture occupies the building.

== Description ==
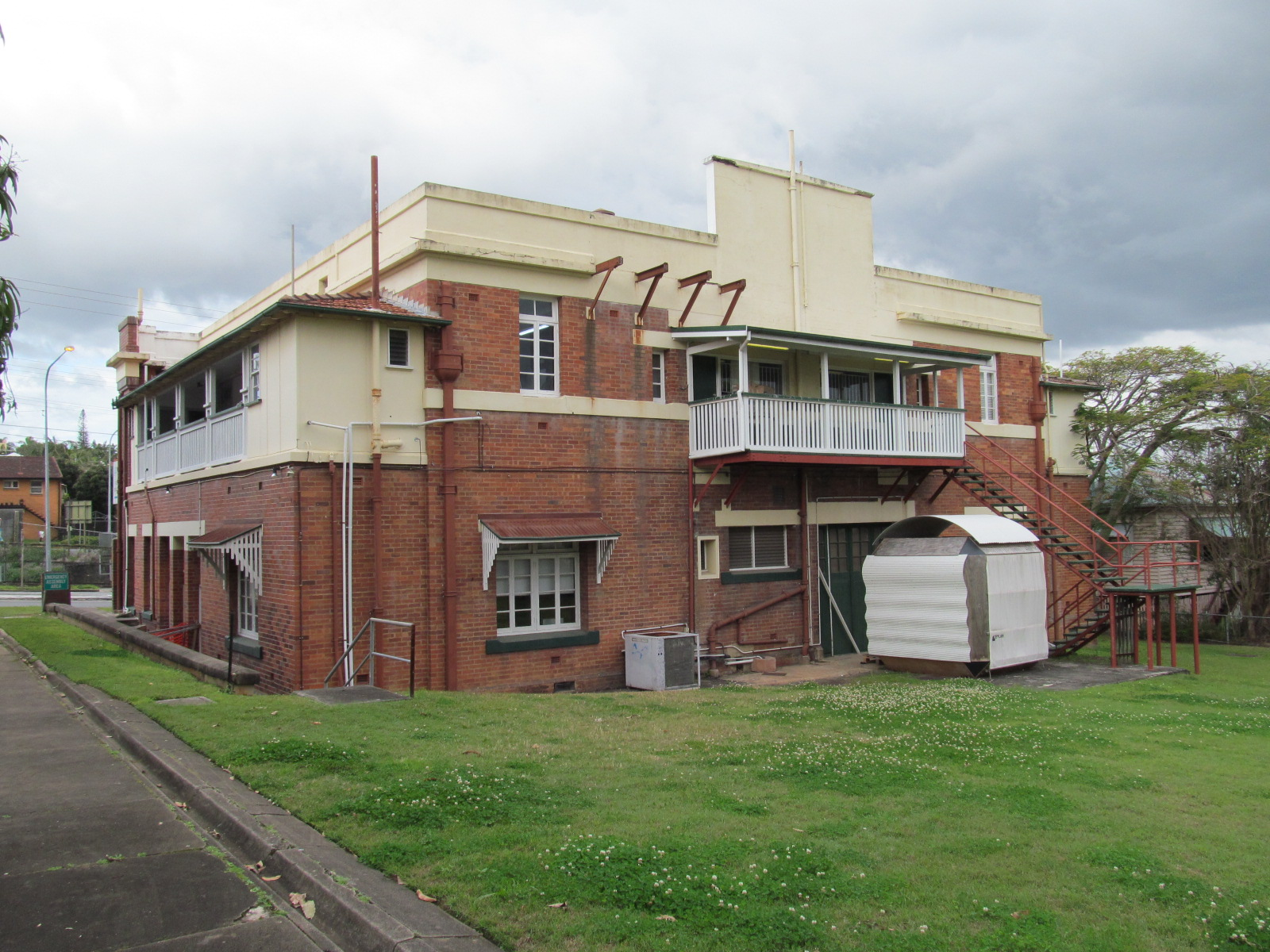
Rear and side view, 2013

A substantial two-storey red and orange face brick building, the former Albion Fire Station stands in a suburban garden setting south of the corner of Bridge and Merehaye Streets, Albion overlooking the Brisbane-Sandgate railway line and directly opposite the road overbridge connecting Hudson Road and Bridge Street.

The main elevation faces east onto Bridge Street and is symmetrical about a recessed parapeted central bay that contains two large arched entrances to the ground floor distinguished by decorative surrounds and infilled with glazing and two deep open porches to the upper level. A plain cream stepped cornice runs around the top of the east, north and south elevations. The central parapet contains the words "ALBION FIRE STATION". The flanking projecting bays are defined by rusticated pilasters to the corners and accommodate a bay of casement windows with fanlights to each of the ground and upper levels. The ground floor window surrounds are distinguished by decorative brickwork matching the main entrance surrounds. The sills to the upper windows are painted cream. A low brick wall to the south accommodates an arched gated entrance to the side entrance to the south side of the upper level. The words "Albion Lodge" are lettered above the gate. A timber fence post stands south of the brick wall. The base of a brick wall stands to the north side of the building.

A foundation stone recording the dedication of the building is set into the plinth of the south bay of the main elevation. Under the inscription "READY AYE READY" it is recorded that the stone was laid on 1 December 1925 by the Chairman of the Metropolitan Fire Brigade Board and lists members of the board.

The asymmetrical south elevation contains three bays of casement windows and a loggia to the ground floor and a verandah enclosed with casement and louvre windows to the upper level. The lintels of the windows are picked out in cream. The pillared loggia is reached by a flight of wide concrete steps from the garden and forms the main entrance to the south side of the upper level. The north elevation has a plain porch entrance approximately half way along the building. The porch has been enclosed with sheeting and louvres. The bays of windows to the north and west at the northwest corner are sheltered by plain timber framed hoods. The rear elevation contains a set of central bifold doors to the ground floor and a flight of timber stairs rises to a timber landing accessing the rear of the upper level.

The main entrance to the ground floor opens into a large central space which continues through a narrowed corridor to the rear timber bi-fold doors. Discrete rooms to the sides and rear open off the central space. Two large rectangular rooms occupy the northwest and southwest corners and are lit by banks of casement windows to each side of the room. The south side contains a stairwell and a large meeting room with a small store room. The north side contains a stairwell and two smaller interconnected rooms with a store room and toilet beyond. A tea room and toilet occupy the rear to the north of the narrow corridor space. The interior walls are painted and plastered masonry and the ceilings are rendered with a textured finish. The side rooms are a step above the central space. Doors to each side of the central space open to the stairwells that rise to the upper level. The rear toilet contains an intact early urinal.

Stairwells to the north and south arrive at the upper level that is a mirror image of spaces about a central dividing wall running east–west. In each half the rooms work off a central corridor. This main dividing wall is cut through at its east and west ends to provide access between the two halves of the floor. In each half, the outer corner rooms open to the enclosed verandahs that run the length of the north and south sides; a large central room to the east opens onto the open porch and the central room to the west is partitioned into a number of small spaces and opens out to the rear landing. The deep open porches to the centre of the east side offer a prospect over the railway line to the suburb of Albion beyond. Tilting fanlights to the central north–south partition facilitate ventilation through the rooms. Throughout the walls and ceilings are painted and plastered masonry. Each stairwell is lit by a large window and contains a flight of timber stairs with a substantial timber handrail and decorative metal balustrade.

The verandah roofs are clad with terracotta tiles and the main hipped roof is clad with corrugated metal sheeting.

The building is set in a suburban yard with grassed and treed areas to the south and west. A timber shed with gable roof stands in the centre of the backyard to the west of the building. A freestanding brick chimney stands south of the shed. Narrow concrete paths run along the north and south sides of the building. There are flights of concrete stairs at each end of the north path. A chain wire fence runs along the south boundary and a timber fence runs along the west boundary. The north and east boundaries are not fenced. The adjacent property to the corner of Merehaye and Bridge Streets accommodates a dirt carpark used by the tenants of the building. Shaded by luxurious mature mango trees, the carpark provides a lush garden setting for the building and affords opportunities for views of the former fire station building.

== Heritage listing ==
The former Albion Fire Station was listed on the Queensland Heritage Register on 28 February 2003 having satisfied the following criteria.

The place is important in demonstrating the evolution or pattern of Queensland's history.

The former Albion Fire Station, constructed as part of the rationalisation of the network of fire brigades in Brisbane undertaken by the Metropolitan Fire Brigades Board after 1921, is important in demonstrating the development of fire fighting services in Brisbane.

The place demonstrates rare, uncommon or endangered aspects of Queensland's cultural heritage.

The former Albion Fire Station, a rare example a substantial early twentieth century fire station, is important in demonstrating the architecture and planning of fire stations at that time, accommodating brigade facilities to the ground floor and residential quarters to the upper level. The former Albion Fire Station is important as the sole survivor of only four substantial brick fire stations constructed during this time.

The place is important in demonstrating the principal characteristics of a particular class of cultural places.

The former Albion Fire Station, a rare example a substantial early twentieth century fire station, is important in demonstrating the architecture and planning of fire stations at that time, accommodating brigade facilities to the ground floor and residential quarters to the upper level. The former Albion Fire Station is important as the sole survivor of only four substantial brick fire stations constructed during this time.

The place is important because of its aesthetic significance.

The former Albion Fire Station, with its associated grounds, has aesthetic and architectural significance as a substantial, robust civic building. A landmark building, thoughtfully designed and distinguished by finely detailed brickwork, it has a dramatic presence on Bridge Street, a busy thoroughfare through the northside of Brisbane.

The place has a special association with the life or work of a particular person, group or organisation of importance in Queensland's history.

The former Albion Fire Station is important for its association with the work of the Department of Public Works and is a fine example of work produced by the Department during the early decades of the twentieth century.
