= Holy Cross Laundry =

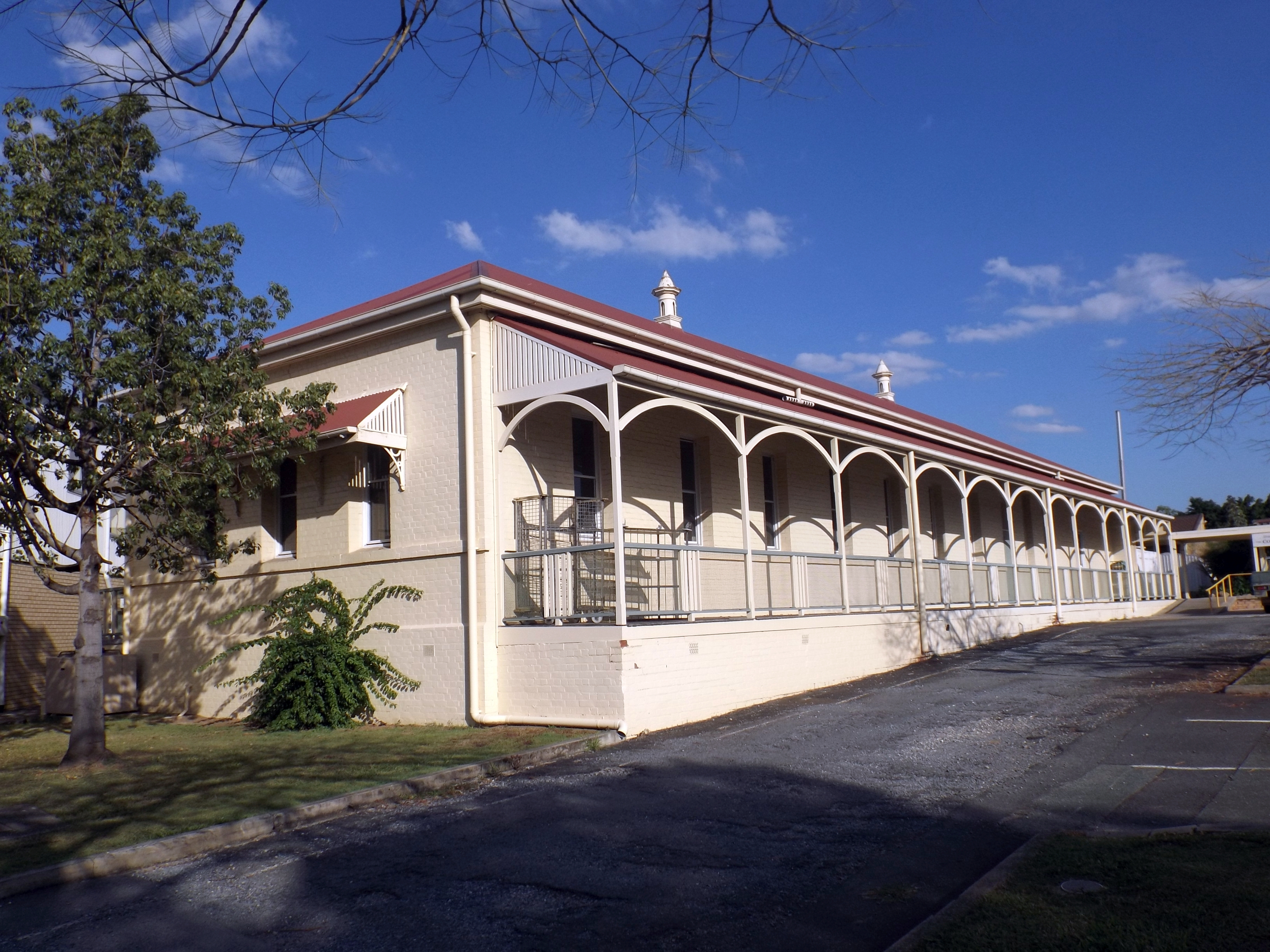
- Building in 2015

- Location within Queensland Location within Australia
- 27.4231°S 153.0414°E
- Location: 60 Bridge Street, Wooloowin, City of Brisbane, Queensland, Australia

History
- Design period: 1870s–1890s (late 19th century)
- Built: 1888–1905

Site notes
- Architect: Francis Drummond Greville Stanley

Queensland Heritage Register
- Official name: Holy Cross Laundry
- Type: state heritage (built)
- Designated: 21 October 1992
- Reference no.: 600359
- Significant period: 1888–1889, 1899, 1905 (fabric)

Holy Cross Laundry is a heritage-listed benevolent institution at 60 Bridge Street, Wooloowin, City of Brisbane, Queensland, Australia. It was designed by Francis Drummond Greville Stanley and built from 1888 to 1905. It was also known as Magdalen Asylum. It was added to the Queensland Heritage Register on 21 October 1992.

== History ==
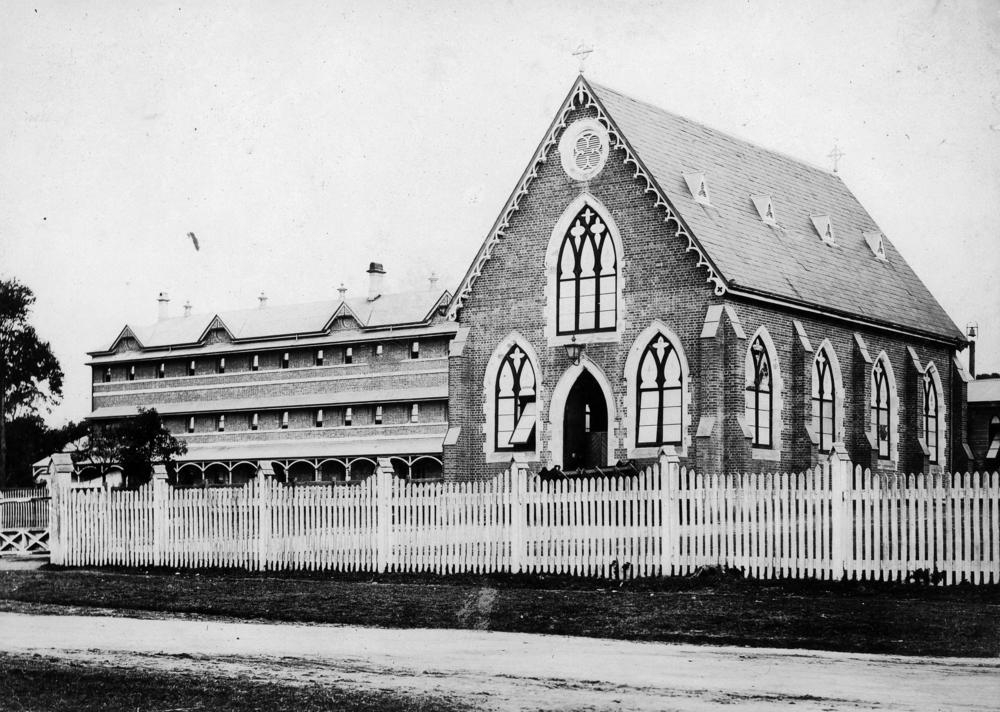
Holy Cross Church, circa 1895

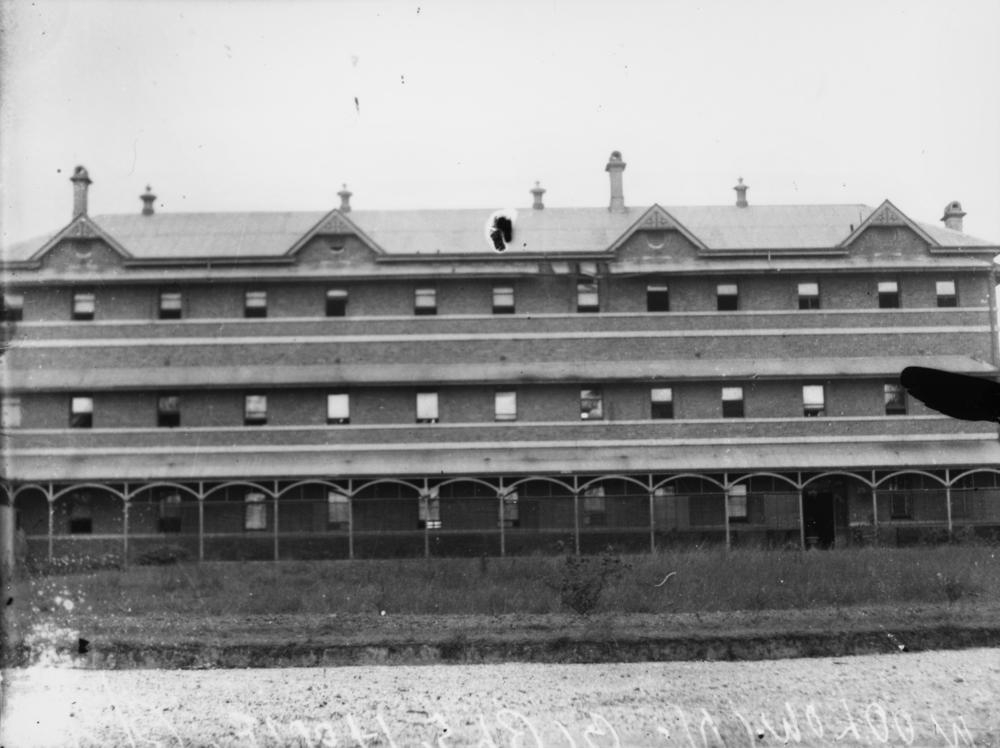
Magdalene Asylum, 1937

The Holy Cross Laundry was constructed as an auxiliary wing to the Holy Cross Retreat at Wooloowin in 1888–89.

The retreat was built for the Sisters of Mercy as a tribute to the work of James Quinn, Roman Catholic Bishop of Brisbane from 1859 until his death in 1881. It was erected adjacent to the Church of the Holy Cross (1886) in Chalk Street, to a design prepared by former Queensland Colonial Architect Francis Drummond Grenville Stanley.

The institution, known more familiarly as the Magdalen Asylum, provided protection for unmarried mothers and women who were either destitute or deemed to be in need of institutional restraint, and for intellectually handicapped persons, regardless of creed. The adjacent laundry functioned as both a source of revenue to support the home and as a means of teaching skills and discipline.

The original laundry consisted of a single-storeyed section at the eastern end of the dormitory building containing ironing and mangling rooms, and a southern wing which housed the sorting room and washhouse. In 1899 a northern wing in brick with a timber verandah was added. It was designed as a model ironing room equipped with a purpose-built recess which housed tiered stoves capable of heating sixty-eight irons. Large roller presses were in use by 1902 and electric irons were installed in 1917. From the outset the laundry employed steam-driven facilities, initially powered by a gas-operated boiler. An oil burner was installed in the 1980s, and the old boiler-room chimney was demolished.

In the 1890s the laundry secured a number of shipping contracts and by the 1920s had grown to become one of the largest commercial laundries in Brisbane.

In 1977 the dormitory building and kitchen wing were demolished, but the steam laundry has been maintained as a sheltered workshop for intellectually handicapped women and men.

In 2014, it offers both supported employment for people with disabilities and general employment, with most employees being covered under an enterprise agreement and the remainder under contract.

Following a five-year negotiated sale with the Sisters of Mercy, in 2020 Cedar Wood Properties redeveloped the site as the Greville masterplanned community. The 3.6-hectare (8.9-acre) site has been developed to have 84 new terrace homes, 189 new apartments and 7 heritage apartments within the heritage-listed laundry. The laundry area is used for the living areas of the heritage apartments with a modern two-storey addition to the rear of the laundry building to provide bedroom and garages. The community is named Greville in honour of Francis Drummond Greville Stanley as the original architect.

== Description ==
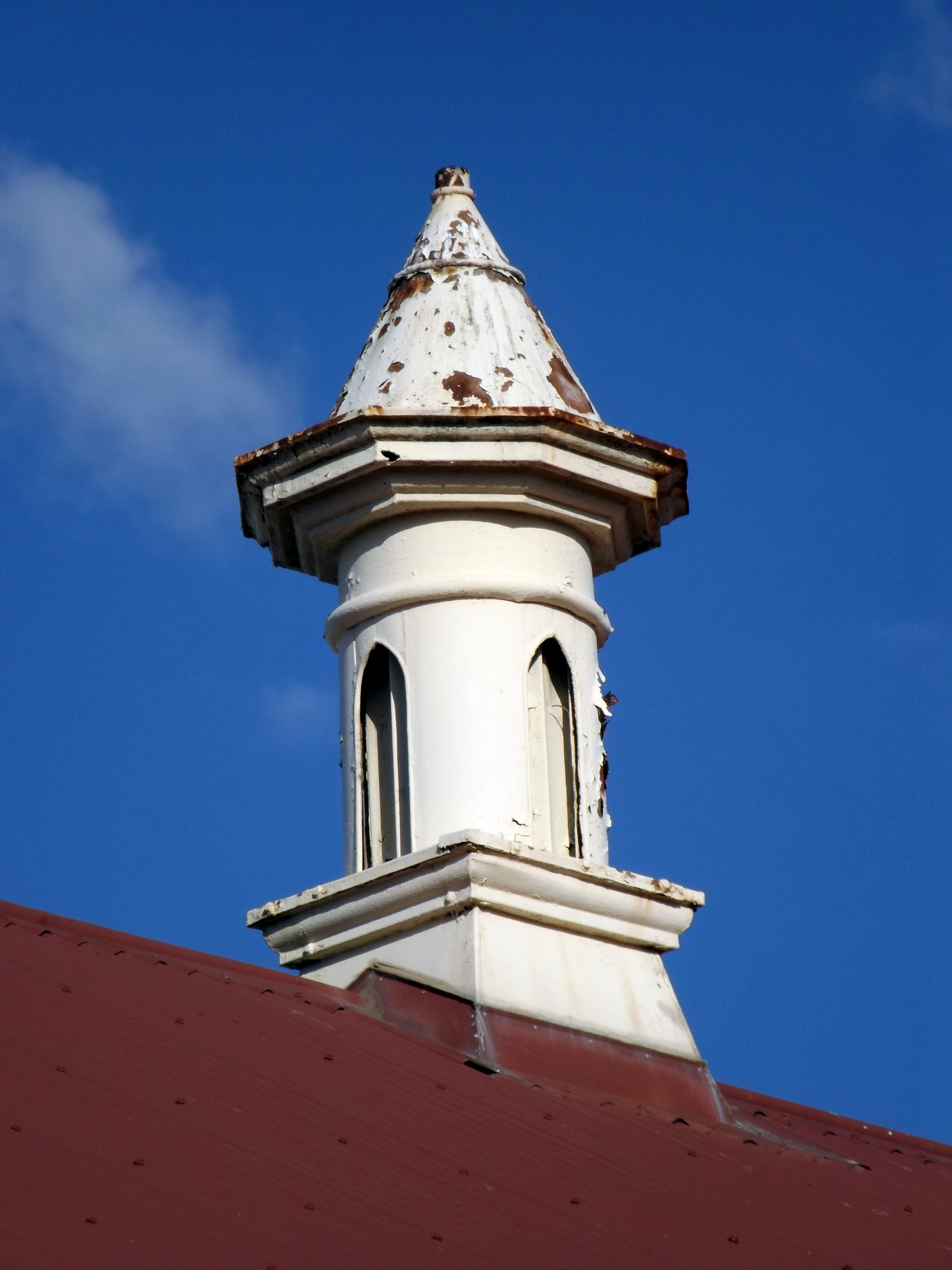
Roof detail, 2015

The laundry is a single-storeyed brick and timber structure with a corrugated iron roof. The older sections rest on brick piers and probably originally were unpainted externally.

The 1889 brick wing retains its basic form, although sections of walls have been removed, the ceiling is lined, the exterior has been plastered and painted, and the whole has been re-roofed. It still houses the washing room, part of the ironing room and the boiler-room. A recent brick wing has been added to the east of this section to serve as the sorting room.

The wall separating the old wing from the 1899 brick addition has been removed to create one large ironing room. The extension was designed for maximum ventilation, and has a high ceiling lined with tongue and groove boards, tall sash windows and verandahs the length of each side, and large ventilators in the roof. The verandah detailing originally echoed that of the dormitory building, but the existing posts, arches and diagonal battening of the western verandah are mostly replacements suggestive of the original. The eastern verandah has been enclosed and remodelled.

In 1905 a section of the eastern wall of this second wing was removed and a timber extension was constructed to house the packing room; this has been extended since to include office facilities. The loading dock between this timber wing and the boiler room has been enclosed recently.

None of the original equipment remains, although two large steam rollers, one manufactured by Mackenzie Bros Ltd of Sydney and dated 22 April 1936, and another (1940s), are still in operation.

== Heritage listing ==
Holy Cross Laundry was listed on the Queensland Heritage Register on 21 October 1992 having satisfied the following criteria.

The place is important in demonstrating the evolution or pattern of Queensland's history.

The Holy Cross Laundry, Wooloowin is significant historically because it is the oldest charitable institutional laundry continuing in operation in Brisbane, and provides rare surviving evidence of the workhouse tradition, associated with a refuge for destitute women in the 19th century.

The place demonstrates rare, uncommon or endangered aspects of Queensland's cultural heritage.

The Holy Cross Laundry, Wooloowin is significant historically because it is the oldest charitable institutional laundry continuing in operation in Brisbane, and provides rare surviving evidence of the workhouse tradition, associated with a refuge for destitute women in the 19th century.

The place is important in demonstrating the principal characteristics of a particular class of cultural places.

The Holy Cross Laundry also survives as an example of late 19th century institutional building style, demonstrating adjustments to regional climatic conditions in an industrial context.

The place has a special association with the life or work of a particular person, group or organisation of importance in Queensland's history.

The place has an important association with the Sisters of Mercy and their involvement in pioneering and maintaining charitable institutions in Queensland.
