= Lutwyche =

- Suburb
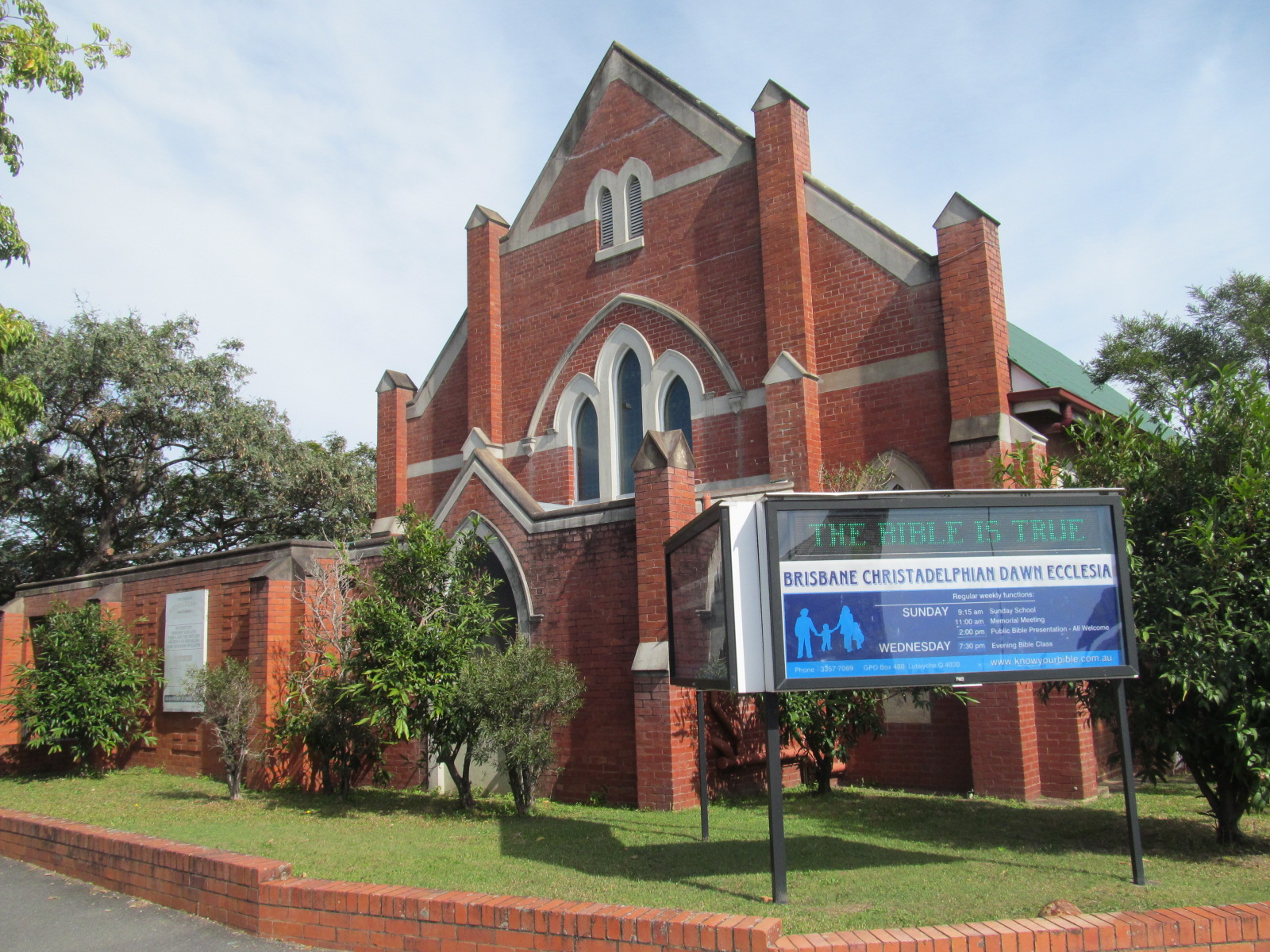
- Lutwyche Christadelphian Church

- Interactive map of Lutwyche
- Coordinates: 27.4219°S 153.0336°E
- Country: Australia
- State: Queensland
- City: Brisbane
- LGA: City of Brisbane (Marchant Ward)
- Location: 5.8 km (3.6 mi) N of Brisbane CBD

Government
  - State electorates: Clayfield; Stafford
  - Federal division: Brisbane

Area
  - Total: 0.9 km^{2} (0.35 sq mi)

Population
  - Total: 4,610 (2021 census)
  - Density: 5,120/km^{2} (13,300/sq mi)
- Time zone: UTC+10:00 (AEST)
- Postcode: 4030
Suburbs around Lutwyche
Gordon Park	Kedron	Wooloowin
Gordon Park	Lutwyche	Wooloowin
Grange	Windsor	Albion

Lutwyche (/ˈlʌtwɪtʃ/ LUT-witch) is a northern suburb in the City of Brisbane, Queensland, Australia. In the 2021 census, Lutwyche had a population of 4,610 people.

Lutwyche is 5.8 kilometres (3.6 mi) north of the city's central business district.

== Geography ==
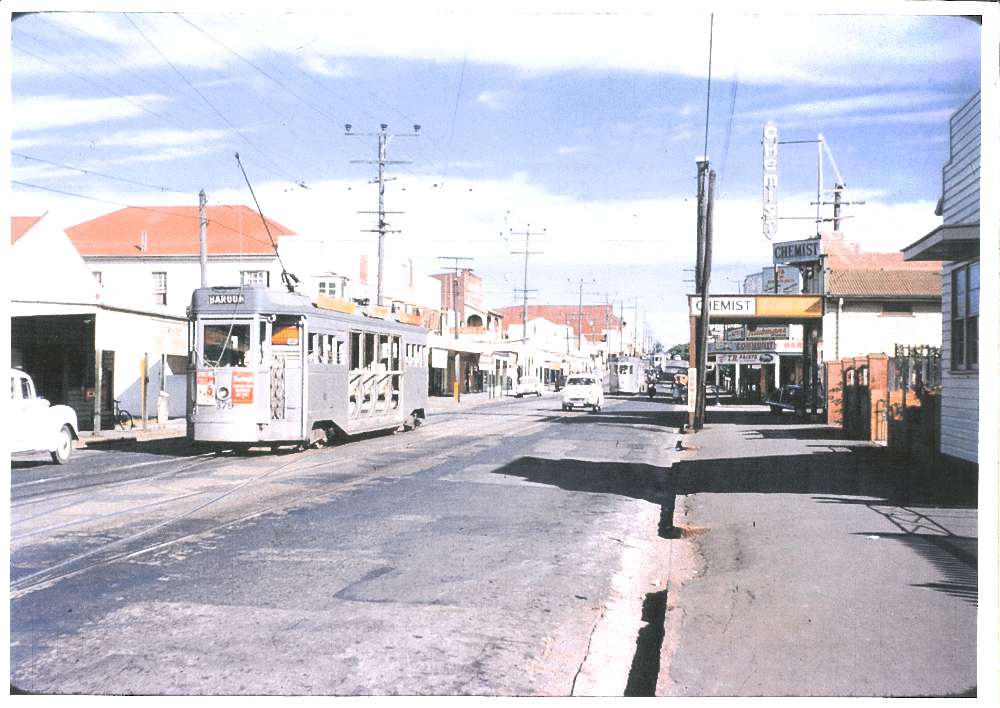
Shopping area on Lutwyche Road in 1954

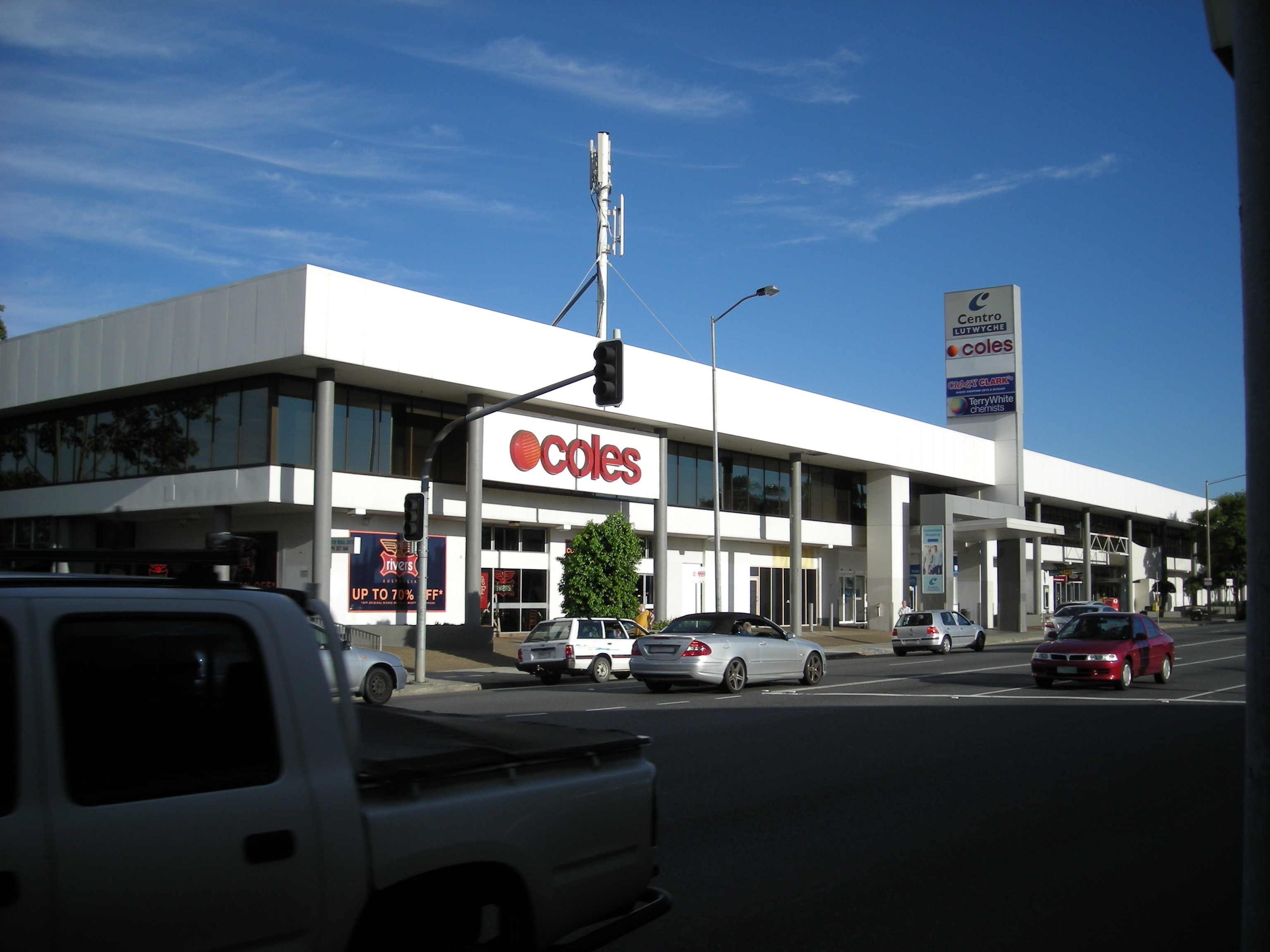
Centro Lutwyche shopping centre

Lutwyche Road, a busy thoroughfare that is part of Metroad 3 is the main road through the suburb. Lutwyche Road is lined with many small shops and restaurants in addition to the HomeCo shopping centre. Kedron Brook, a creek lined with parklands and a bikeway, forms the north-western boundary of Lutwyche.

== History ==
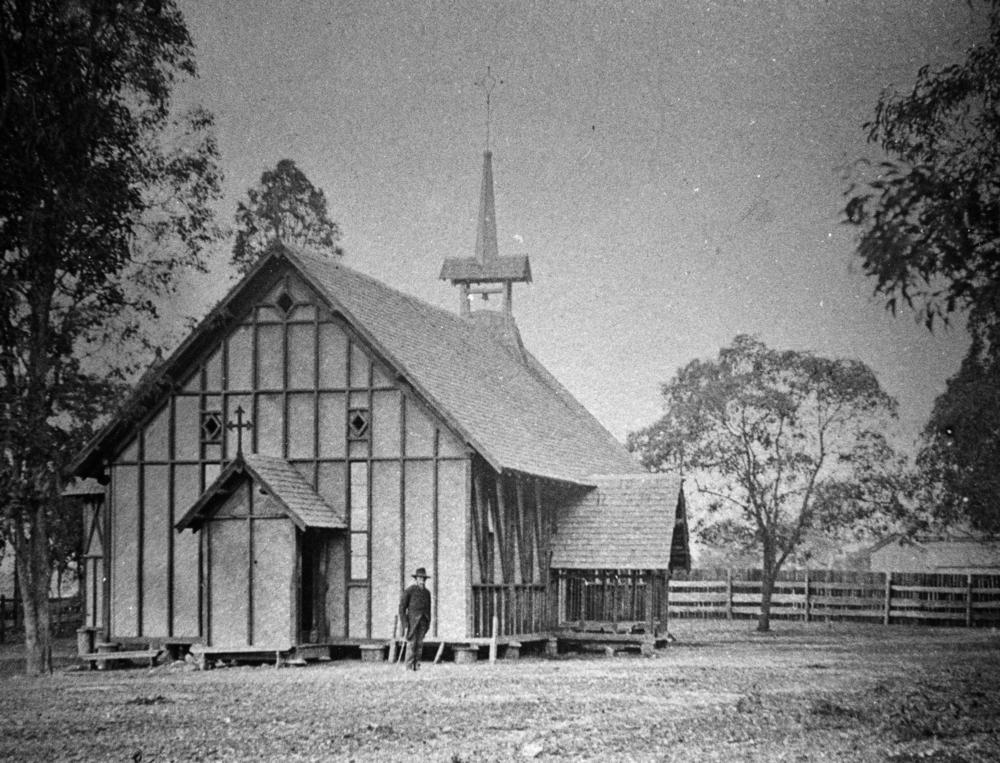
Early wooden St Andrew's Church at Lutwyche in 1888

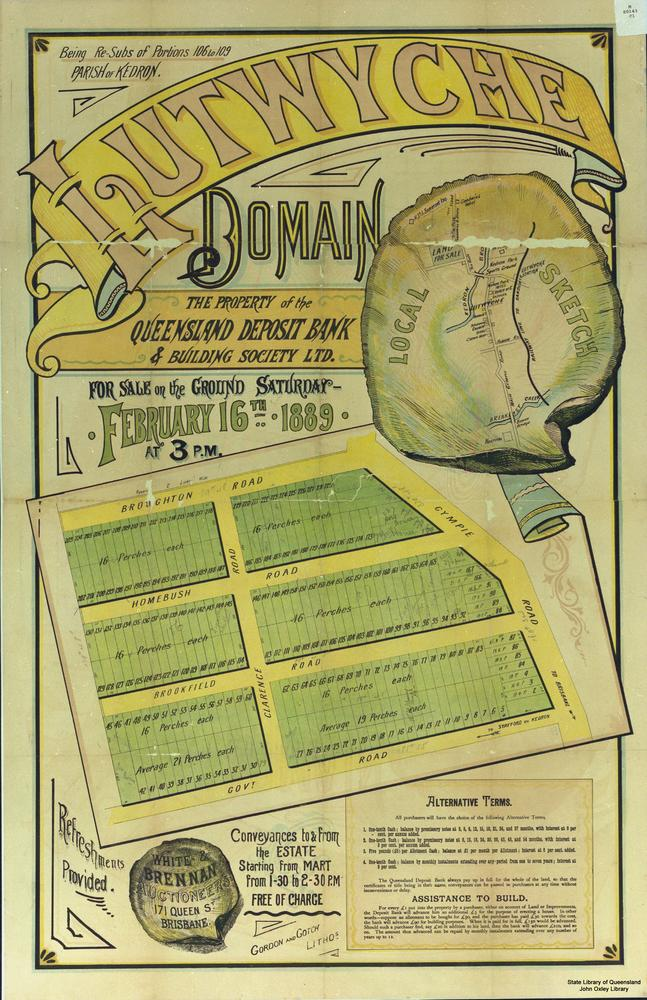
Estate map for Lutwyche Domain, 1889

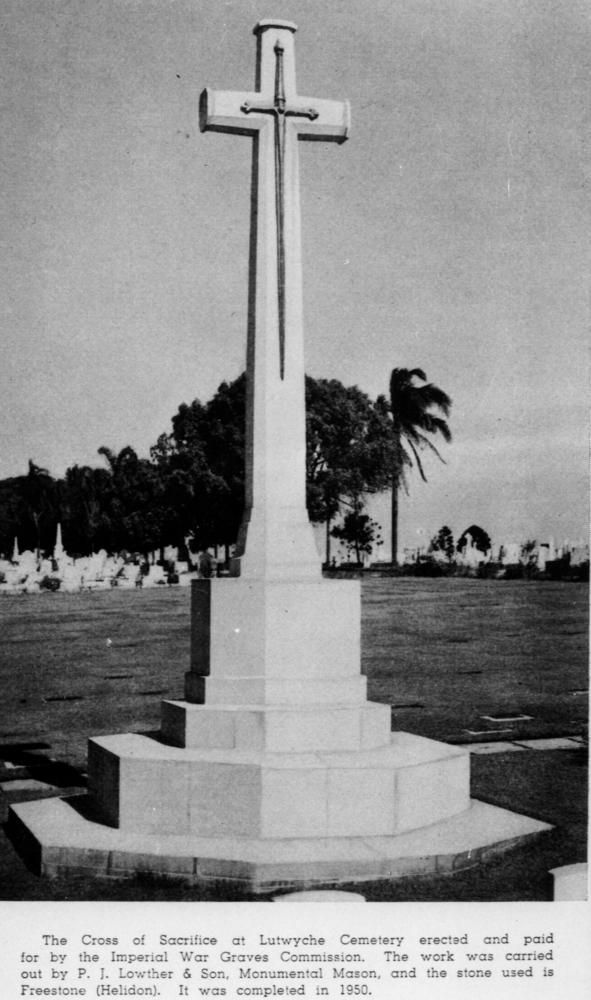
Cross of Sacrifice at Lutwyche Cemetery, circa 1954

The suburb is named after Alfred Lutwyche, a judge of the Supreme Court of New South Wales who was appointed as Supreme Court judge at Moreton Bay on 21 February 1859, shortly before Queensland was granted self-government.

On 12 January 1864, Lutwyche purchased the site for what was to become St. Andrew's Church of England (1866) on Lutwyche Road, donating the land to the Church in 1865, and was actively involved in the construction of the church. On his death on 12 June 1880, he was buried on the southern side of the Church where his grave remains a prominent feature of the churchyard dominated by a granite Celtic cross that was erected as the headstone by his widow Mary Ann. A portrait of Alfred Lutwyche can be found in the Supreme Court building in Brisbane.

In February 1886, 1 acre (0.40 ha) of land was reserved for a School of Arts.

A Cross of Sacrifice commemorating those who served in World War I and World War II was erected at Lutwyche Cemetery in 1950.

Prior to December 1968, the suburb was served by frequent tram services which converged along Lutwyche Road, from Chermside, Kalinga (until 1962) and Stafford, with the Stafford line branching off at Bradshaw Street, Lutwyche. Further south Grange trams branched off Lutwyche Road at Maygar Street, on the border of Lutwyche and Windsor. These services combined to provide an off-peak service of a tram every 2½ minutes along Lutwyche Road in the late 1950s.

== Demographics ==
In the 2011 census, the population of Lutwyche was 2,801, 50.4% female and 49.6% male. The median age of the Lutwyche population was 33 years of age, 4 years below the Australian median. 63.8% of people living in Lutwyche were born in Australia, compared to the national average of 69.8%; the next most common countries of birth were New Zealand 4.2%, India 3.3%, England 3.1%, Italy 2.2%, China 1.4%. 74.8% of people spoke only English at home; the next most common languages were 3.4% Italian, 1.5% Mandarin, 0.9% Spanish, 0.8% Hindi, 0.8% Arabic.

In the 2016 census, Lutwyche had a population of 3,454 people.

In the 2021 census, Lutwyche had a population of 4,610 people.

== Heritage listings ==
Lutwyche has a number of heritage-listed sites, including:

- Conon, 29 Conon Street (27.4245°S 153.036°E)
- Windsor Air Raid Shelter, Lutwyche Road (27.4253°S 153.0332°E)
- Wooloowin State School, 663 Lutwyche Road (now in Wooloowin, 27.4175°S 153.0371°E)
- Killila, 100 Stoneleigh Street (27.4261°S 153.0361°E)

== Education ==
There are no schools in Lutwyche. The nearest government primary schools are Wooloowin State School in neighbouring Wooloowin to the north-east and Windsor State School in neighbouring Windsor to the south. The nearest government secondary school is Kedron State High School in neighbouring Kedron to the north. There are also a number of non-government schools nearby.

== Transport ==
Lutwyche is well served by frequent express (333) and all-stops Transport for Brisbane buses which run along Lutwyche Road to the city.

After the completion of the Brisbane Airport Link and Northern Busway, the Windsor Lutwyche precinct is served by the Lutwyche busway station, which provides an entrance to the Northern Busway tunnel at Truro Street and consists of an open-air entrance plaza and new bus stops at Truro Street (southbound), and outside Windsor State School (northbound). The Lutwyche busway station was completed in June 2012.
