= Town of Windsor =

Local government area of Queensland, Australia

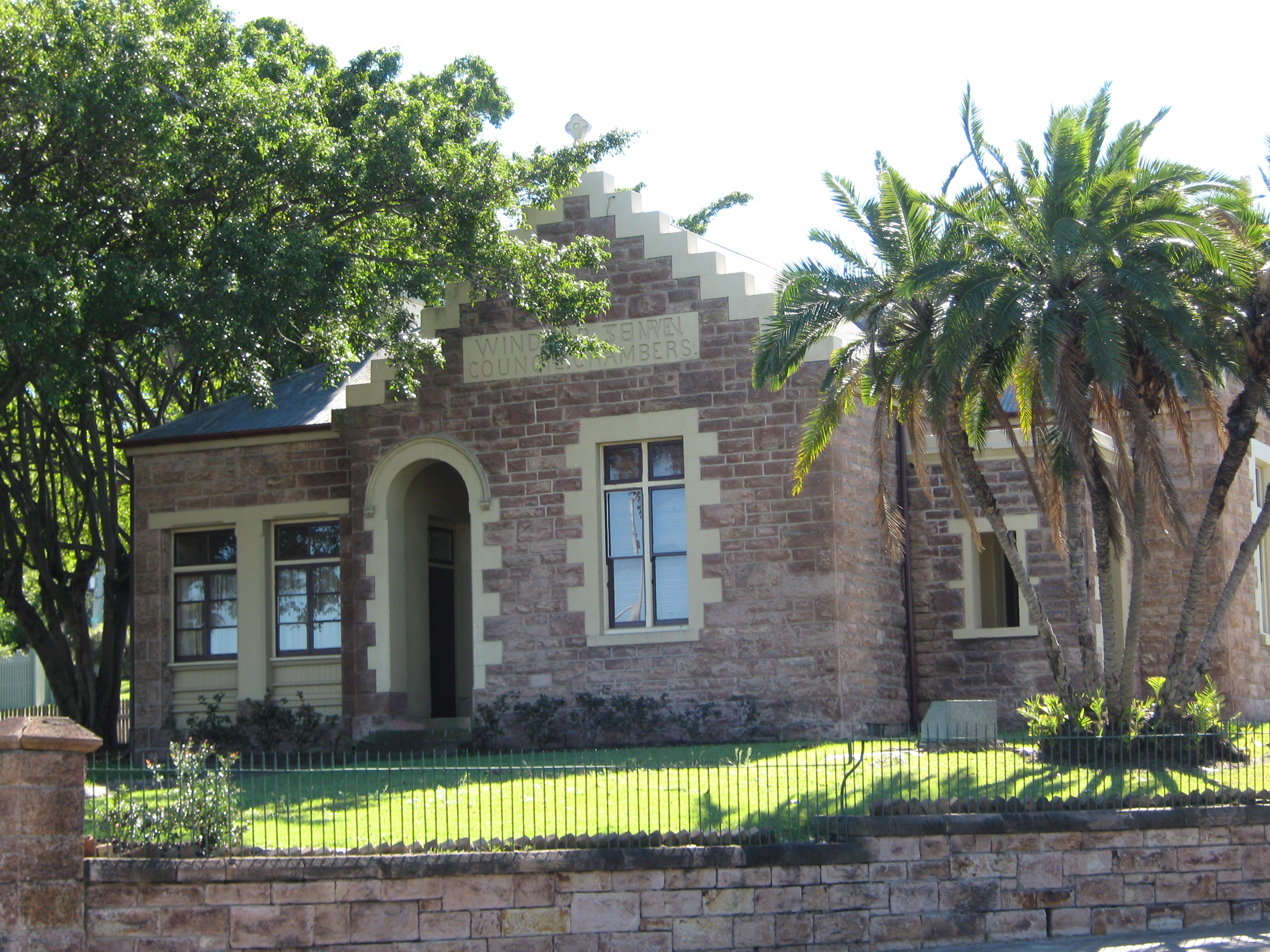
Windsor Town Hall, 2008

The Town of Windsor is a former local government area of Queensland, Australia, located in northern Brisbane.

== History ==
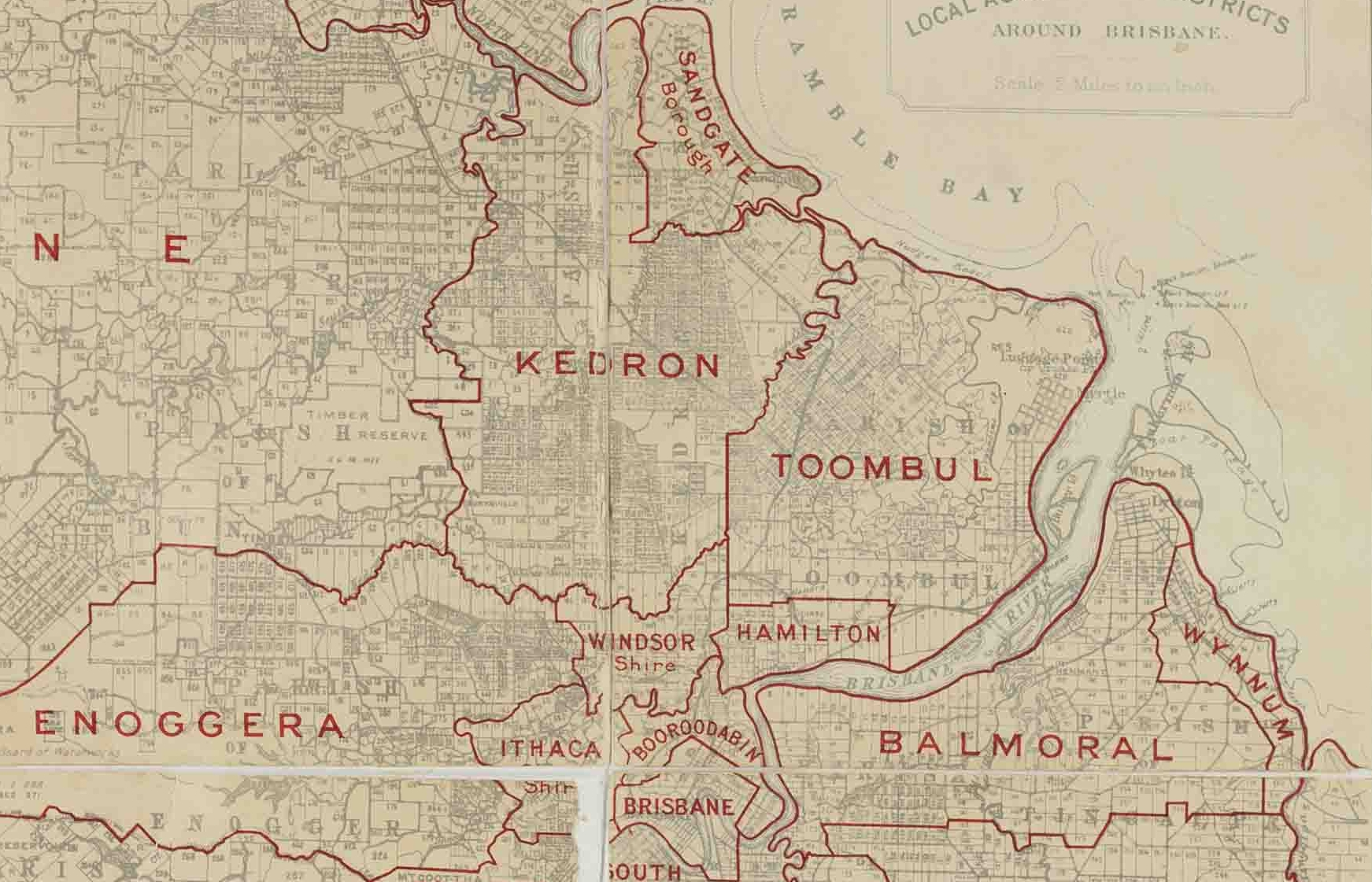
Map of Shire of Windsor and adjacent local government areas, March 1902

On 11 February 1887, a portion of the Ithaca Division was proclaimed a municipality to be known as the Shire of Windsor.

On 10 February 1904, the shire was proclaimed the Town of Windsor.

On 1 October 1925, the town was amalgamated into the City of Brisbane.

== Windsor Town Council Chambers ==
In the 1860s, local Brisbane tuff stone was extracted from a quarry at Windsor alongside Lutwyche Road. In 1897 the Windsor Shire Council built their Shire Chambers (later Town Chambers) at 356 Lutwyche Road (corner of Palmer Street) (27.42945°S 153.03214°E), immediately beside the quarry using stone from the quarry.

After the amalgamation into City of Brisbane, the Windsor Town Council Chambers was used as storage and office space by the Brisbane City Council, which undertook a restoration of the building in 1987.

Today it is home to the Windsor and District Historical Society and the National Trust of Queensland; the public is welcome to visit.

The Windsor Town Council Chambers was listed on the Queensland Heritage Register in 1992.

== Presidents and mayors ==
The presidents of the Windsor Shire Council were:

- 1887: Matthew Rigby
- 1888: Cornelius Ryan
- 1889: Kenneth McLennan
- 1890: Charles Birkbeck
- 1891: George Jopp
- 1892: John McIntyre
- 1893: William Lane
- 1894: Thomas Hawkins
- 1895: William Mooney
- 1896–1897: Hugh Cameron
- 1898–1899: Kenneth McLennan (again)
- 1900: James Carroll
- 1901: Angus Briscoe
- 1902: Thomas Gardiner
- 1903: Frederick Hart

The mayors of the Windsor Town Council were:

- 1904: Kenneth McLennan (again)
- 1905: Austin Graham
- 1906: George Hewitt
- 1907: James Price
- 1908: William Bowser
- 1909: Thomas Gardiner (again)
- 1910: George Hewitt (again)
- 1911: Arthur Bale
- 1912: William Parsons
- 1913: Thomas Gardiner (again)
- 1914: William Clark
- 1915: Charles Taylor
- 1916: Robert Lane
- 1917: Alexander (Alex) Inglis
- 1918–1919: William Jolly
- 1920: Robert Lane
- 1921–1923: William Jolly (again)
- 1924–1925: Henry Bond
