= Wooloowin =

- Suburb
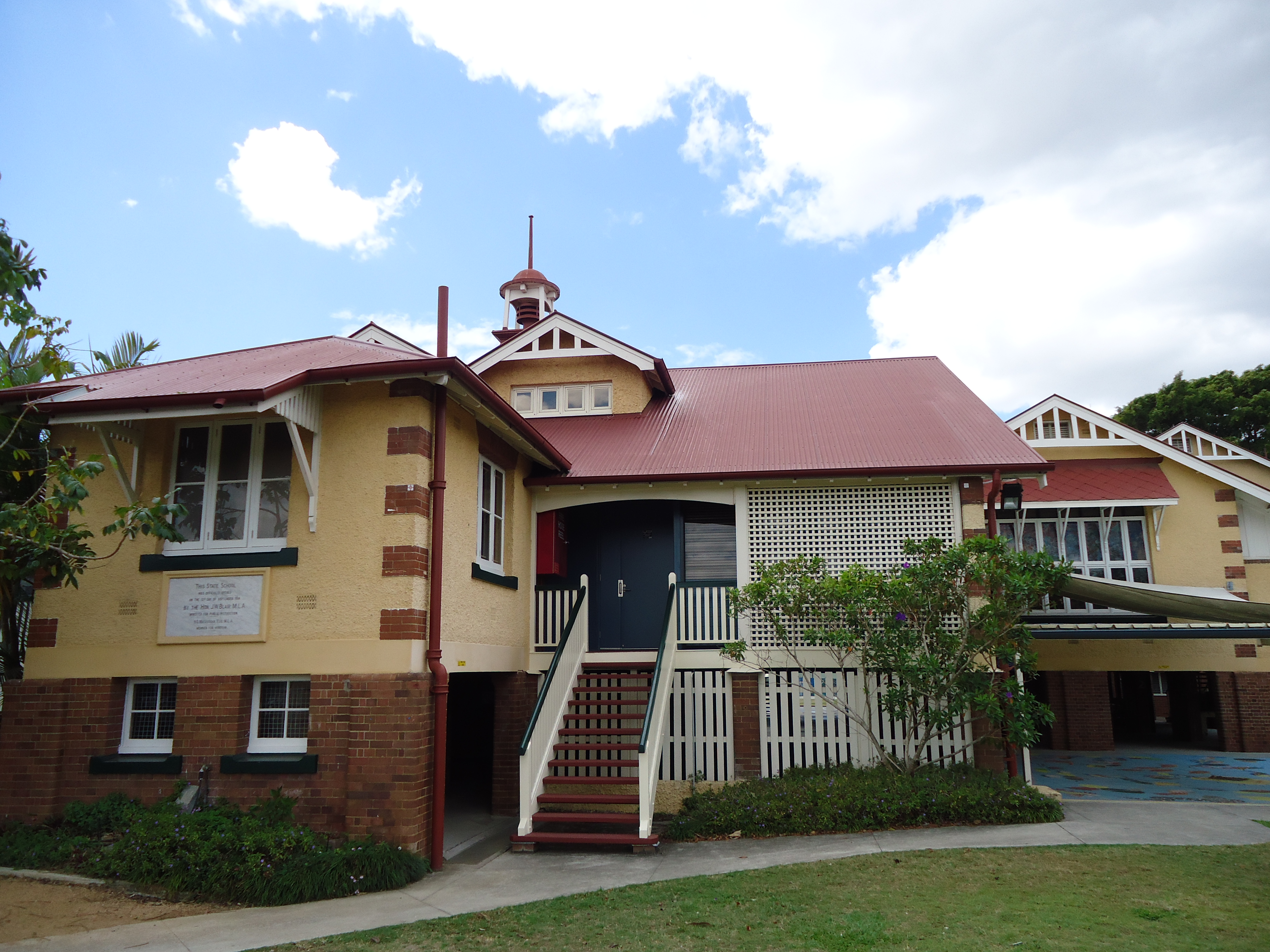
- Wooloowin State School, 2011

- Interactive map of Wooloowin
- Coordinates: 27.4197°S 153.0416°E
- Country: Australia
- State: Queensland
- City: Brisbane
- LGA: City of Brisbane (Hamilton Ward)
- Location: 6.1 km (3.8 mi) NNE of Brisbane CBD

Government
  - State electorate: Clayfield
  - Federal division: Brisbane

Area
  - Total: 1.1 km^{2} (0.42 sq mi)

Population
  - Total: 4,029 (2021 census)
  - Density: 3,660/km^{2} (9,500/sq mi)
- Time zone: UTC+10:00 (AEST)
- Postcode: 4030
Suburbs around Wooloowin
Kedron	Kalinga	Kalinga
Lutwyche	Wooloowin	Clayfield
Lutwyche	Albion	Clayfield

Wooloowin (/ˈwʊləwən/ WUU-lə-wən) is a suburb in the City of Brisbane, Queensland, Australia. In the 2021 census, Wooloowin had a population of 4,029 people.

== Geography ==
Wooloowin is an inner-north suburb of Brisbane, Australia located approximately 5–6 km north of the city's central business district.

== History ==
The origin of the suburb's name has been attributed to either the local Indigenous Australian term for a pigeon or the term for a species of fish. It was the home of Brisbane's first Resident Judge, Alfred Lutwyche, who lived in Kedron Lodge.

Holy Cross Primary School opened in 1889.

A stump-capping ceremony for Wooloowin Methodist Church was held on Saturday 30 November 1901. The site was on Old Sandgate Road at the junction with Bayview Terrace (now 170 Bonney Avenue). While the church was being built, it was destroyed by a cyclone in January 1901. The church was re-built and opened on Sunday 13 April 1902 by Reverend Robert Stewart, President of the Queensland Methodist Conference. In 1975 Wooloowin Methodist Church amalgamated with Eagle Junction Congregational Church (at 211 Bonney Avenue, Clayfield) to form the Bonney Avenue Cooperative Parish. Following the amalgamation that created the Uniting Church in Australia in 1977, it was renamed Clayfield Uniting Church and decided to operate exclusively from the site of the Wooloowin Methodist Church. The Eagle Junction Congregational Church and its adjacent hall at 5 Norman Parade into private ownership; both buildings still exist and are listed on the Brisbane Heritage Register. The foundation stone of the current Clayfield Uniting Church building was laid on Sunday 2 March 1986 by Reverend Leslie Tiplin Vickery and it was opened and dedicated on 5 April 1987 by Reverend Barry Dangerfield.

Wooloowin State School opened on 15 September 1914.

Kedron State High School opened on 23 January 1956.

Kalinga was a residential district within Wooloowin. On 16 October 2015, Kalinga was officially gazetted as a suburb, having been excised from Wooloowin.

== Demographics ==
In the 2011 census, Wooloowin had a population of 5,942 people.

In the 2016 census, Wooloowin had a population of 3,938 people.

In the 2021 census, Wooloowin had a population of 4,029 people.

== Heritage listings ==
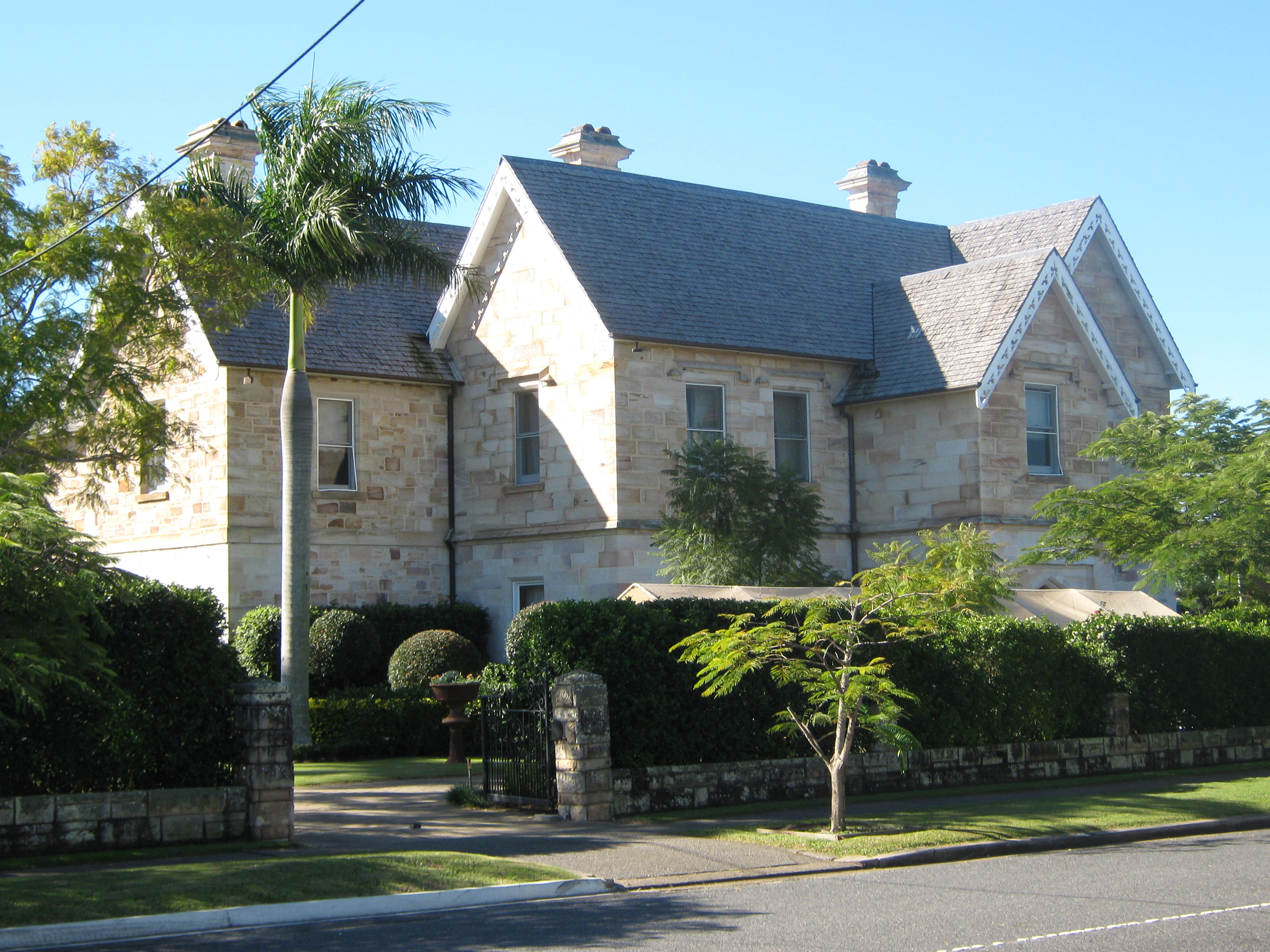
Kedron Lodge, original residence of Justice Lutwyche.

Wooloowin has a number of heritage-listed sites, including:

- 54 Adamson Street: San Michelle (house, also known as Nanteos)
- 76 Adamson Street: Interwar flats
- 81 Adamson Street: D Juan (house)
- 109 Adamson Street: Shop
- 42 Bridge Street: former Albion Fire Station
- 60 Bridge Street: Holy Cross Laundry
- 60 Bridge Street: Sisters of Mercy Convent
- 28 Chalk Street: former Holy Cross Catholic Church
- 5 Dickson Street: Shop & residence (also known as Milton & Cameron's Cabinet Works)
- 20 Inwood Street: Cottage
- 22 Inwood Street: Cottage
- 31 Kedron Street: Sydney Villa
- 134 Kedron Park Road: Brisbane City Council Tramways Substation No. 8
- 64 Kent Road: Clytha (house)
- 45 Lisson Grove: Mornington (house)
- 663 Lutwyche Road: Wooloowin State School
- 33 Mcintyre Street: Victorian-era house
- 108 Mclennan Street: Camden (house)
- 26 Oliver Street: Thurso (house)
- 28 Oliver Street: Nelley (house)
- 31 Rigby Street: Witherby (house)
- 55 Rose Street: Eboracum (house)
- 63 Rose Street: Interwar-era house
- 23 Stopford Street: Federation-era house
- 52 View Street: Federation-era house
- 17 Wooloowin Avenue: Victorian-era house

Heritage sites formerly in Wooloowin but now in Kalinga:

- 100 Bertha Street, Kalinga: Kalinga Park
- 123 Nelson Street, Kalinga: Kedron Lodge

== Education ==
Wooloowin State School is a government primary (Prep–6) school for boys and girls at 663 Lutwyche Road (27.4173°S 153.0366°E). In 2018, the school had an enrolment of 325 students with 27 teachers (22 full-time equivalent) and 20 non-teaching staff (9 full-time equivalent).

Holy Cross School is a Catholic primary (Prep–6) school for boys and girls at 40 Morris Street (27.4240°S 153.0396°E). In 2018, the school had an enrolment of 206 students with 20 teachers (15 full-time equivalent) and 13 non-teaching staff (8 full-time equivalent).

There is no secondary school in Wooloowin but Kedron State High School is just beyond on boundary of Wooloowin and Kedron.

== Amenities ==
Despite its name, Clayfield Uniting Church is at 170 Bonney Avenue in Wooloowin (27.4186°S 153.0474°E).

A number of male and female sporting groups use Shaw Park including Norths Rugby Club Northern Suburbs District Cricket Club and Wilston Norths Junior Cricket Club.

== Transport ==
The suburb is serviced by Brisbane City Council buses (Route 321) and contains two train stations, Eagle Junction and Wooloowin. Several Queensland government institutions are located in this suburb, including Kedron State High School and the State of Queensland's State Emergency Services headquarters.
