= Christopher Porter (disambiguation) =

Christopher Porter is a Canadian political activist

Christopher Porter may also refer to:

- Christopher Porter (architect), 19th century Australian architect
- Christopher J. H. Porter, Australian based pharmaceutical scientist

== See also ==
- Chris Porter (disambiguation)
