= Chris Porter =

Chris Porter may refer to:

- Chris Porter (basketball) (born 1978), American professional basketball player
- Chris Porter (comedian) (born 1979), American comedian
- Chris Porter (footballer, born 1885) (1885–1915), English amateur football inside forward
- Chris Porter (footballer, born 1979), English football goalkeeper and coach
- Chris Porter (footballer, born 1983), English footballer for Oldham Athletic
- Chris Porter (ice hockey) (born 1984), Canadian professional ice hockey left winger
- Chris Porter (producer) (active from 1976), British record producer, engineer and narrator

== See also ==
- Christopher Porter (disambiguation)
