= Kalinga, Queensland =

Kalinga
- Suburb
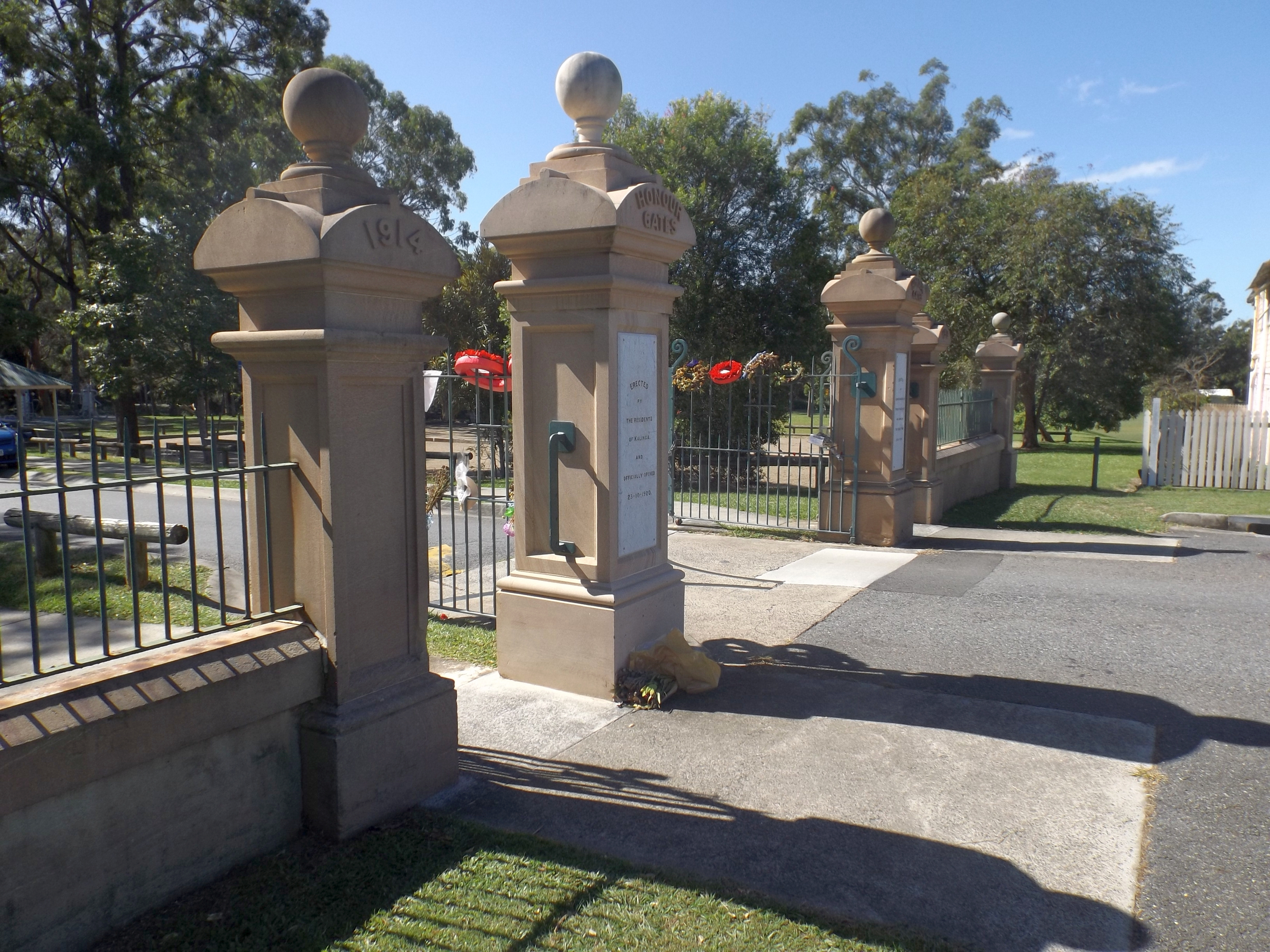
- Memorial gates at Kalinga Park

- Interactive map of Kalinga
- Coordinates: 27.4094°S 153.0483°E
- Country: Australia
- State: Queensland
- City: Brisbane
- LGA: City of Brisbane (Hamilton Ward)
- Location: 9.7 km (6.0 mi) NNE of Brisbane CBD

Government
  - State electorate: Clayfield
  - Federal division: Brisbane

Area
  - Total: 0.9 km^{2} (0.35 sq mi)
- Elevation: 10 m (33 ft)

Population
  - Total: 2,144 (SAL 2021)
- Time zone: UTC+10:00 (AEST)
- Postcode: 4030
Suburbs around Kalinga
Wavell Heights	Nundah	Nundah
Kedron	Kalinga	Clayfield
Kedron	Wooloowin	Clayfield

Kalinga is a suburb in the City of Brisbane, Queensland, Australia. In the 2016 census, Kalinga had a population of 2,126 people.

== Geography ==
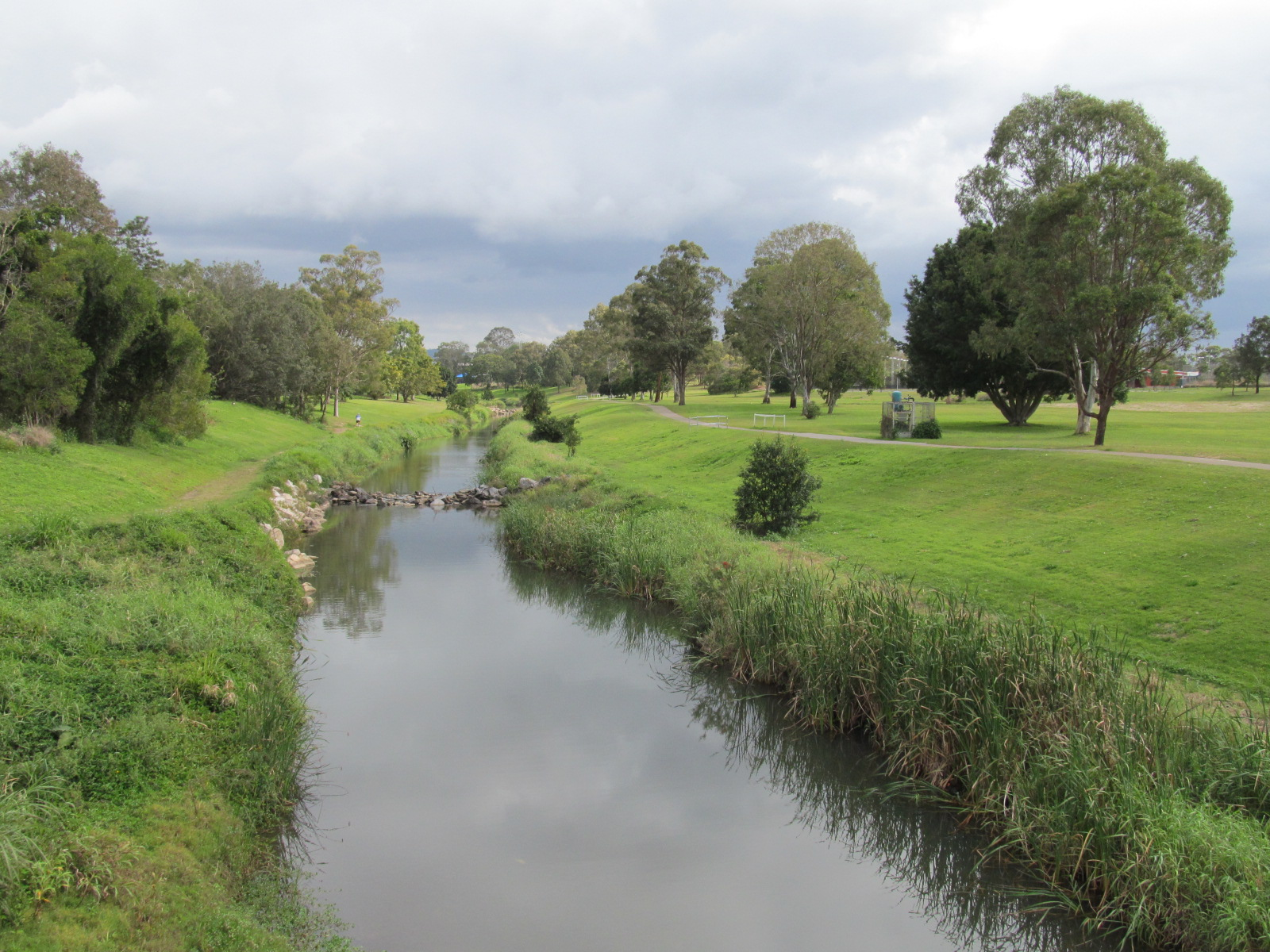
Kedron Brook, west from Shaw Road bridge, 2013

Kalinga is bounded by Kedron Brook to the north. The Kedron Brook bikeway follows the brook on the suburb's north-east boundary with two bridges over the creek to Shaw Park in Wavell Heights (27.4041°S 153.0498°E) and to Toombul Terrace in Nundah (27.4081°S 153.0549°E). There is a third bridge over the creek (27.4045°S 153.0508°E) from the bikeway (but not part of the bikeway) to Carew and New Street in Nundah.

Kalinga is predominantly flat, approximately 10 metres (33 ft) above sea level.

The M7 Airport Link passes under the suburb through a tunnel.

The land use is predominantly residential with the remainder of the suburb being parks. The suburb features a mix of small apartment blocks and standalone houses, with some older style Queenslanders still extant.

== History ==
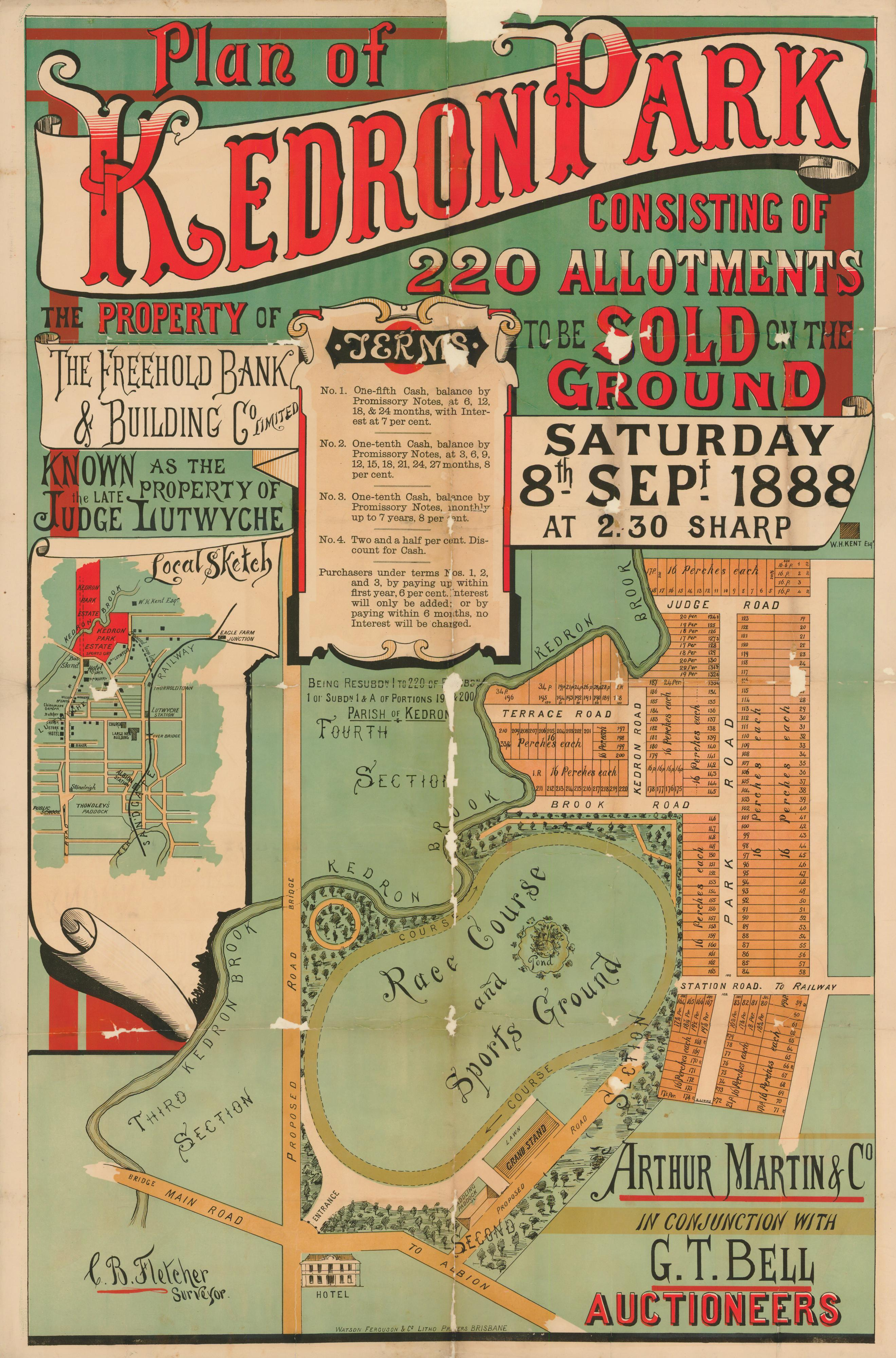
Real estate map of Kedron Park estate, 1888

The name Kalinga derives from Aboriginal word Ngalinnga ("ngalin-nga"), probably from the Yuggera language, Turrbal dialect, meaning belonging to us.

This area is notable for the original residence of Alfred Lutwyche, known as Kedron Lodge.

On Saturday 8 October 1888, auctioneers Arthur Martin and Co offered 220 allotments for sale in the Kedron Park Estate, formerly part of the land owned by the then late Justice Alfred Lutwyche and in the vicinity of Park Road, Judge Road and Station Road.

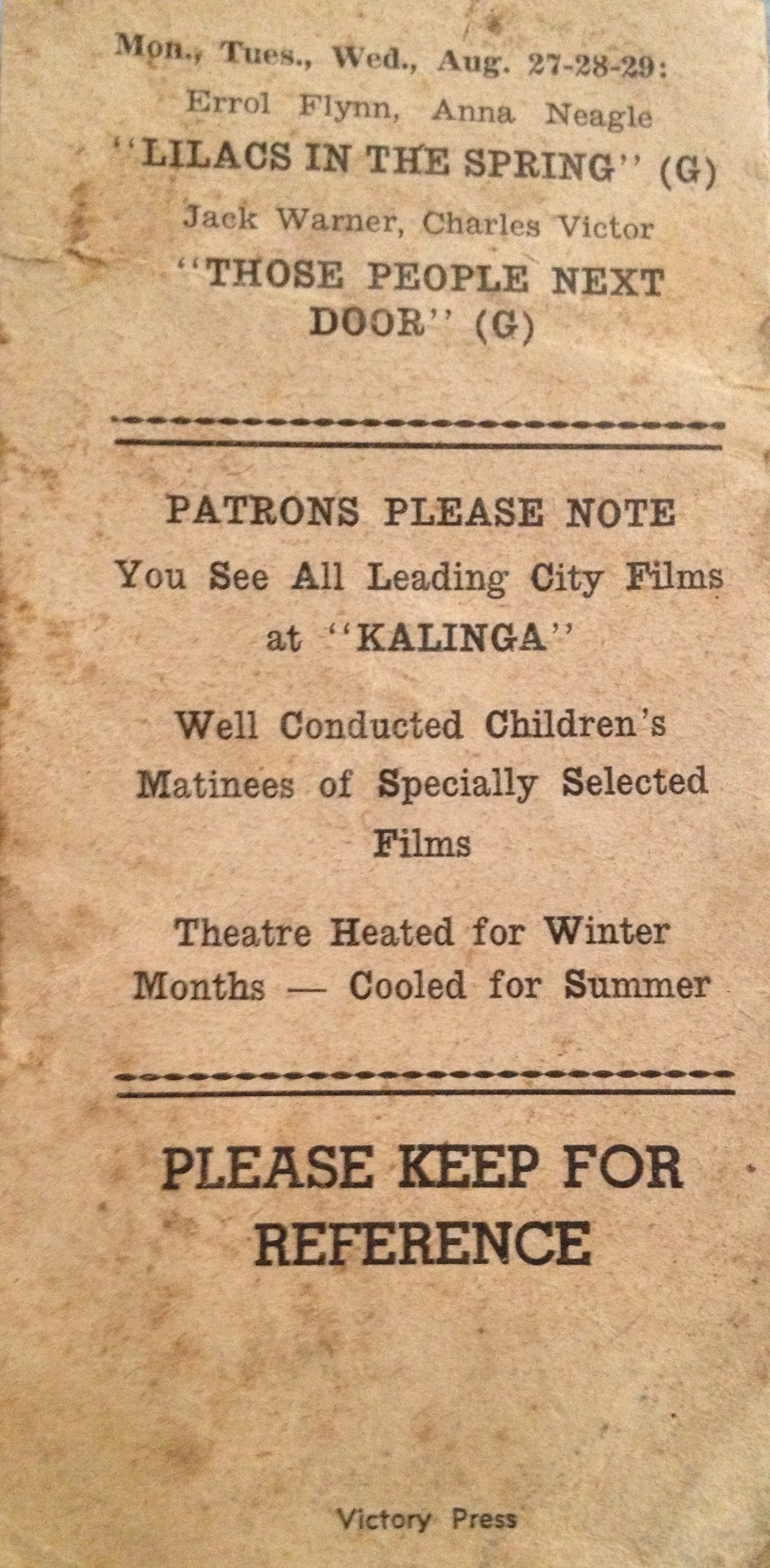
Advertising for Kalinga Theatre, 1956

An open air-movie theatre opened circa 1920 at 70 Lodge Street (27.4105°S 153.0476°E). It was enclosed circa 1929. It seated 400 to 500 people. It was variously known as the Kalinga Picture Palace, Kalinga Picture Theatre, Kalinga Theatre and the Star Theatre. It burned down in the early 1960s and a Mobil petrol station was built on the site.

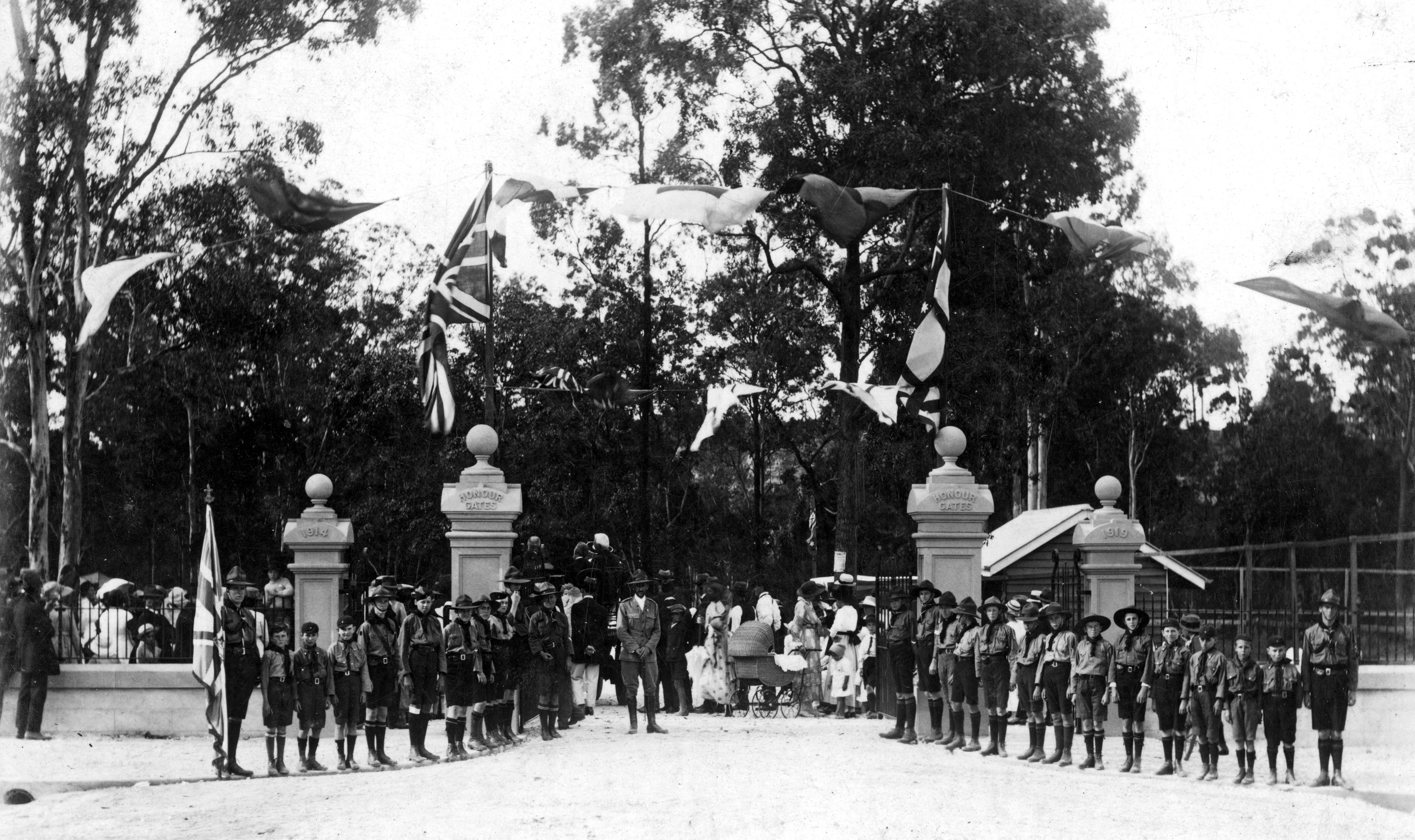
Opening Ceremony, Kalinga Park Memorial Gates, 23 October 1920

On Saturday 23 October 1920, Brigadier-General L.C. Wilson officially opened the war memorial gates at Kalinga Park at the end of Park Street (27.4078°S 153.0519°E) to commemorate the service of local men in World War I. Between 200 and 300 people attended the ceremony. The gates were designed by Andrew Lang Petrie who also did the carving of the Helidon sandstone while the steelwork was done by Mr Rodgers.

Between 1927 and 1962, an electric tram service operated by the Brisbane City Council served the suburb, branching off the Chermside line at Kedron Park Road.

On Sunday 5 February 1928, a Presbyterian Hall was opened in Kalinga by Moderator W.C. Radcliffe.

On Sunday 23 July 1933, Archbishop James Duhig officially blessed and opened Kedron Lodge as a temporary Catholic Church.

On 25 November 1934, Duhig blessed and laid the foundation stone for the new St Anne's Catholic Church. On Sunday 19 May 1935 Duhig opened and dedicated the church, designed in the Spanish style and could accommodate 500 people. On Sunday 1 August 1937 Duhig blessed and opened the adjoining presbytery.

The Kalinga Scout group was formed in 1938. It now occupies the post office of the 17th Australian Personnel Staging Camp in Kalinga Park during World War II.

St Anne's Catholic School opened in February 1948 and closed in 1966.

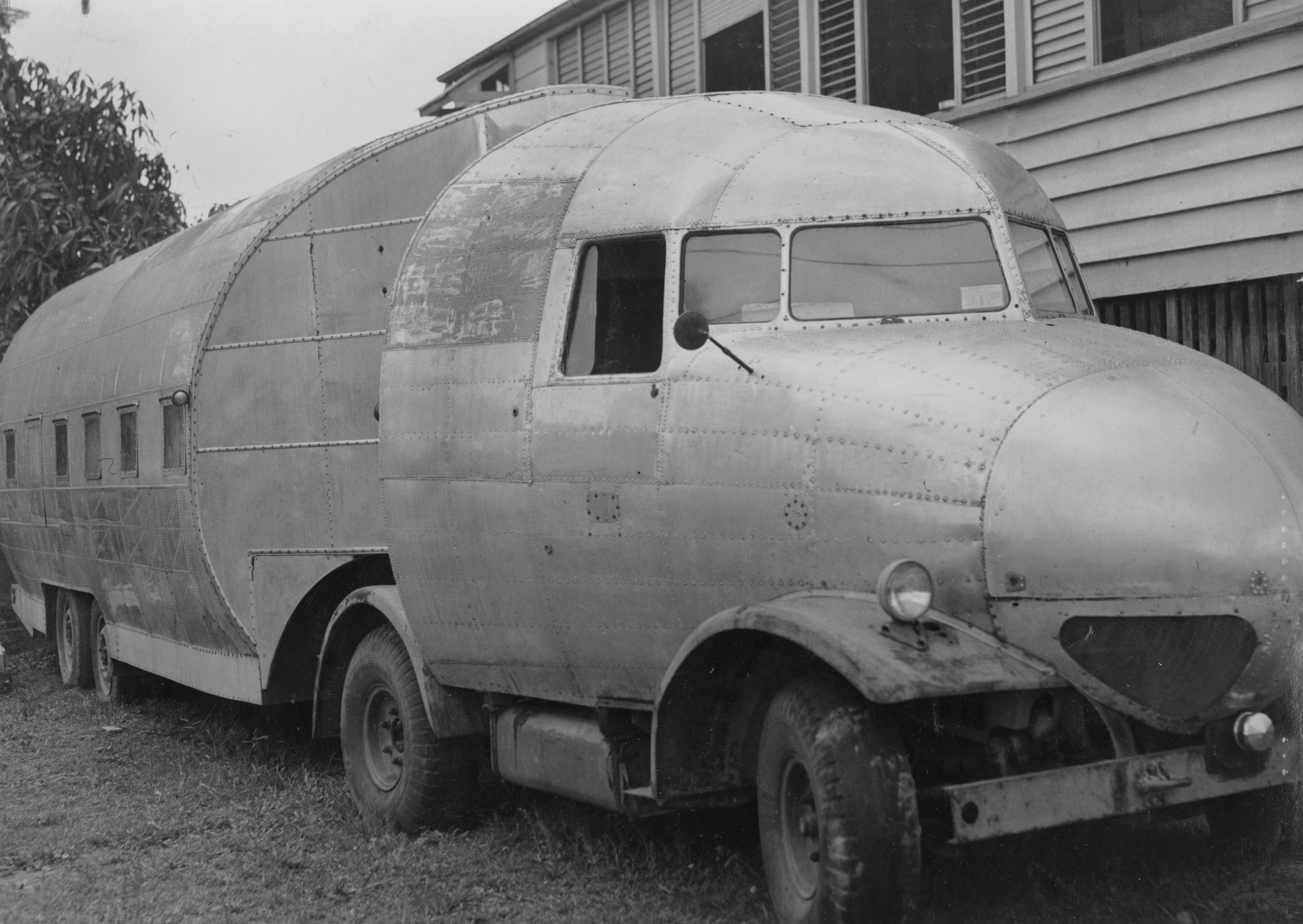
Caravan made from a converted aircraft, 1950

In 1950 mechanic Henry William Endres of 51 Kent Street constructed a caravan from a disused aircraft. It was 37 feet (11 m) long and contained two bedrooms, a bathroom and kitchen.

In 1983, the Presbyterian Church and Hall in Emma Street were purchased by the Presbyterian Church of Eastern Australia (a separate Presbyterian denomination) as their Brisbane church.

The name Kalinga had been in use for the area for many years as a neighbourhood within the suburb of Wooloowin, but it was not until 16 October 2015 that Kalinga was officially gazetted as a suburb, having been excised from Wooloowin following requests from local residents.

== Demographics ==
Historical population
Year	Pop.	±%
2016	2,126	—
2021	2,144	+0.8%

In the 2016 census, Kalinga had a population of 2,126 people, 49% identifying as male and 51% identifying as female. The median age was 38 years of age, one year above the Queensland median and equal to the Australian median. Children aged under 15 years made up 23.5% of the population and people aged 65 years and over made up 12.3% of the population. 73.2% of people living in Kalinga were born in Australia, compared to the national average of 66.7%. The other top responses for country of birth were England 4.3%, New Zealand 3.8%, India 1.4%, South Africa 1.2% and Philippines 0.8%. 84.7% of people only spoke English at home. Other languages spoken at home included Italian 1.0%, French 0.8%, Polish 0.6%, Punjabi 0.6% and Mandarin 0.6%. The most common responses for religion in Kalinga were Catholic 31.7%, No Religion, so described 27.1%, Anglican 15.1%, Not stated 8.9% and Uniting Church 4.9%.

In the 2021 census, Kalinga had a population of 2,144 people, 48.6% identifying as male and 51.4% identifying as female. The median age was 39 years of age, one year above both the Queensland and Australian median. 76.9% of people living in Kalinga were born in Australia, compared to the national average of 66.9%. The other top responses for country of birth were England 4.6%, New Zealand 3.5%, South Africa 0.9%, Philippines 0.8%, United States of America 0.8%. 88.9% of people only spoke English at home. Other languages spoken at home included Italian 1.1%, Japanese 0.6%, Dutch 0.5%, Thai 0.5% and Mandarin 0.4%. The most common responses for religion in Kalinga were No Religion, so described 36.7%, Catholic 31.4%, Anglican 11.7%, Not stated 5.2% and Uniting Church 4.2%.

== Heritage listings ==
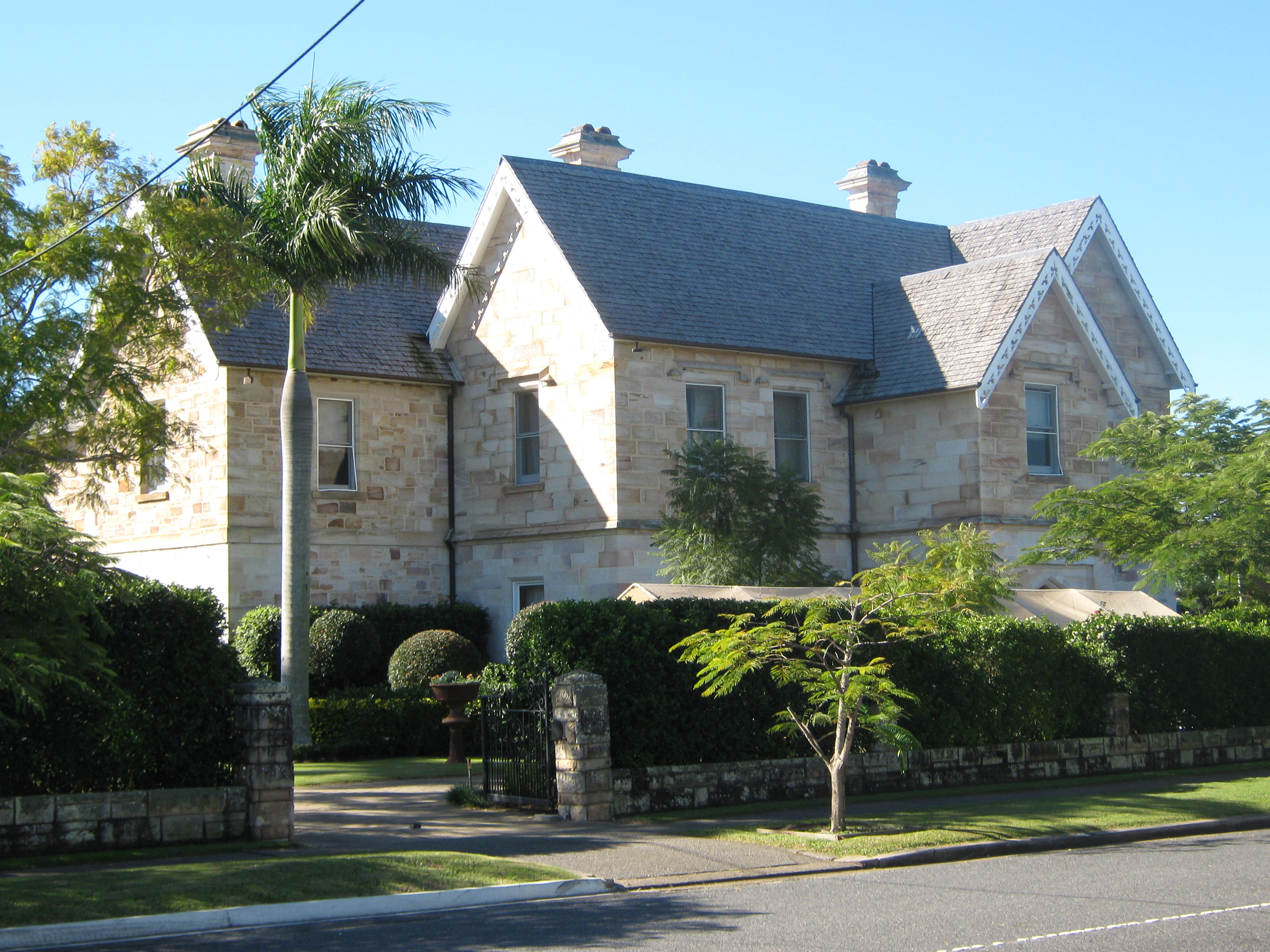
Kedron Lodge, 2008

Kalinga has a number of heritage-listed sites, including:

- Kalinga Park, 100 Bertha Street
- Kedron Lodge, 123 Nelson Street (27.4088°S 153.0448°E)

== Amenities ==
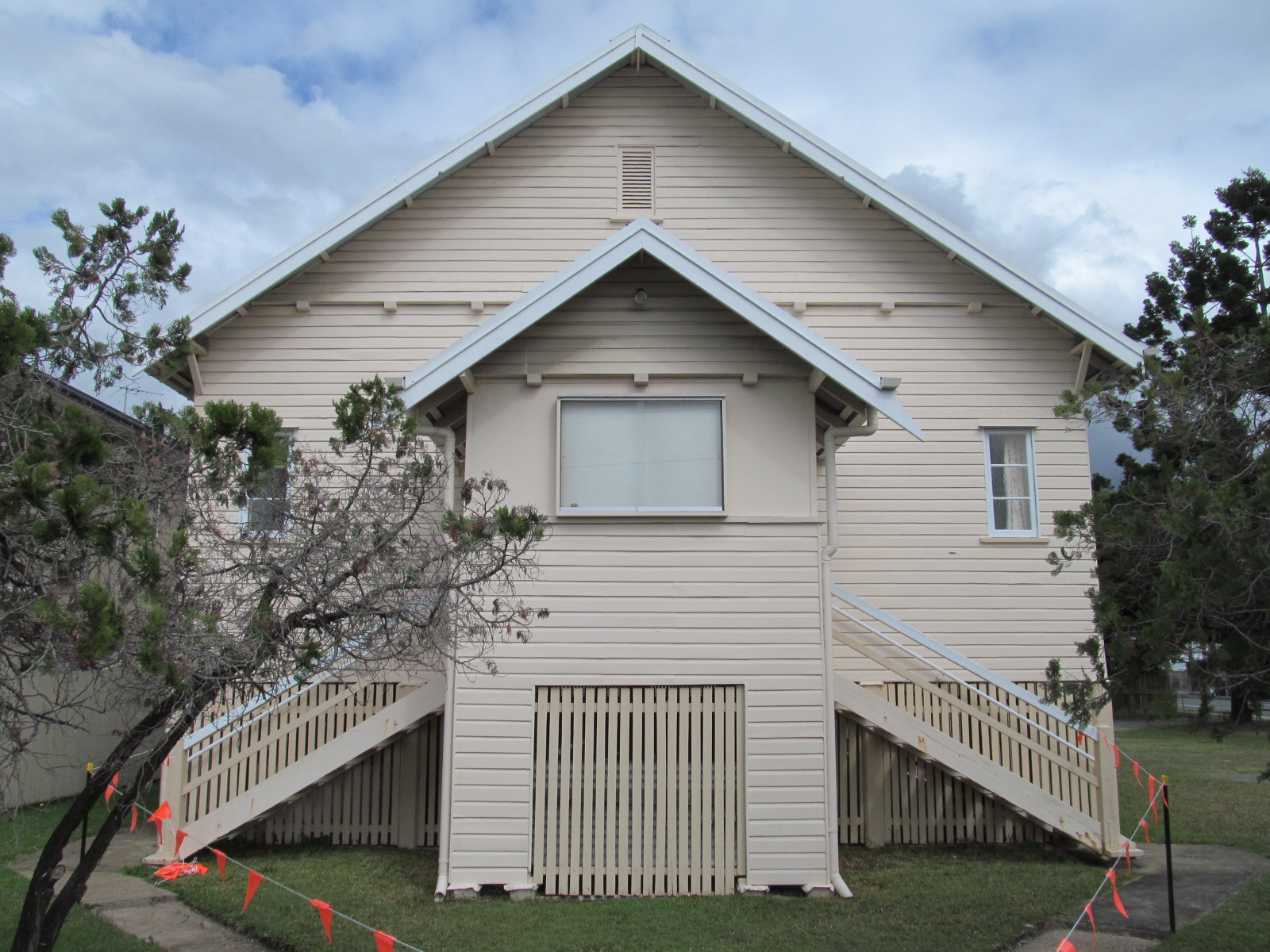
Kalinga Presbyterian Church, 2013

St Anne's Catholic Church is at 127 Nelson Street (27.4089°S 153.0441°E).

Wooloowin Presbyterian Church (formerly the Kalinga Presbyterian Church) is at 78 Emma Street (27.4087°S 153.0474°E). It is the only church in Queensland of the Presbyterian Church of Eastern Australia.

There are a number of parks in the area:

- Brook Road Park at 20 Terrace Street (27.4112°S 153.0406°E)
- Dalkeith Park at 98 Kent Road (27.4135°S 153.0429°E)
- Emma Street Park at 95 Emma Street (27.4079°S 153.0456°E)
- Henry Street Park at 69 Shaw Road (27.4070°S 153.0480°E)
- Kalinga Park at 48 Kalinga Street (27.4082°S 153.0535°E)
- Melrose Park at 76 Rose Street (27.4127°S 153.0454°E)
- Nelson Street Park at 159 Nelson Street (27.4084°S 153.0423°E)

Kalinga Bowls Club is located within Melrose Park (27.4119°S 153.0460°E).

Kalinga Scouts have their hall in Kalinga Park near the Bertha Street entrance (27.4060°S 153.0501°E).

== Education ==
There are no schools in Kalinga. The nearest government primary schools are Eagle Junction State School in neighbouring Clayfield to the south-east and Wooloowin State School in neighbouring Wooloowin to the south-west. The nearest government secondary school is Kedron State High School immediately over the boundary to neighbouring Kedron to the south-west.

Clayfield College in neighbouring Clayfield is a private school providing both primary and secondary education.

== Notable residents ==
- Justice Alfred Lutwyche

== Gallery ==
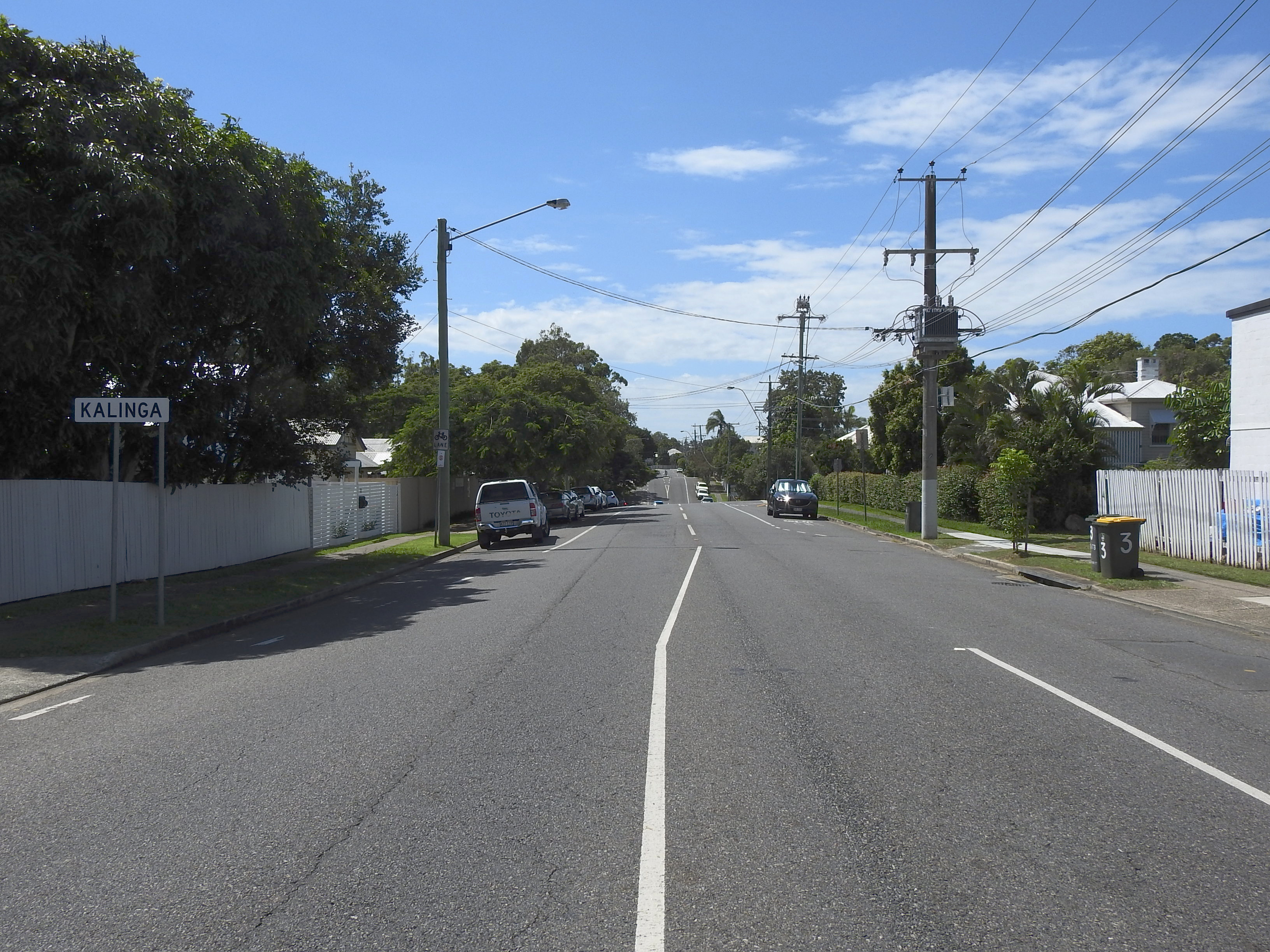
Southern side of Kalinga, on Dawson Street (2021).

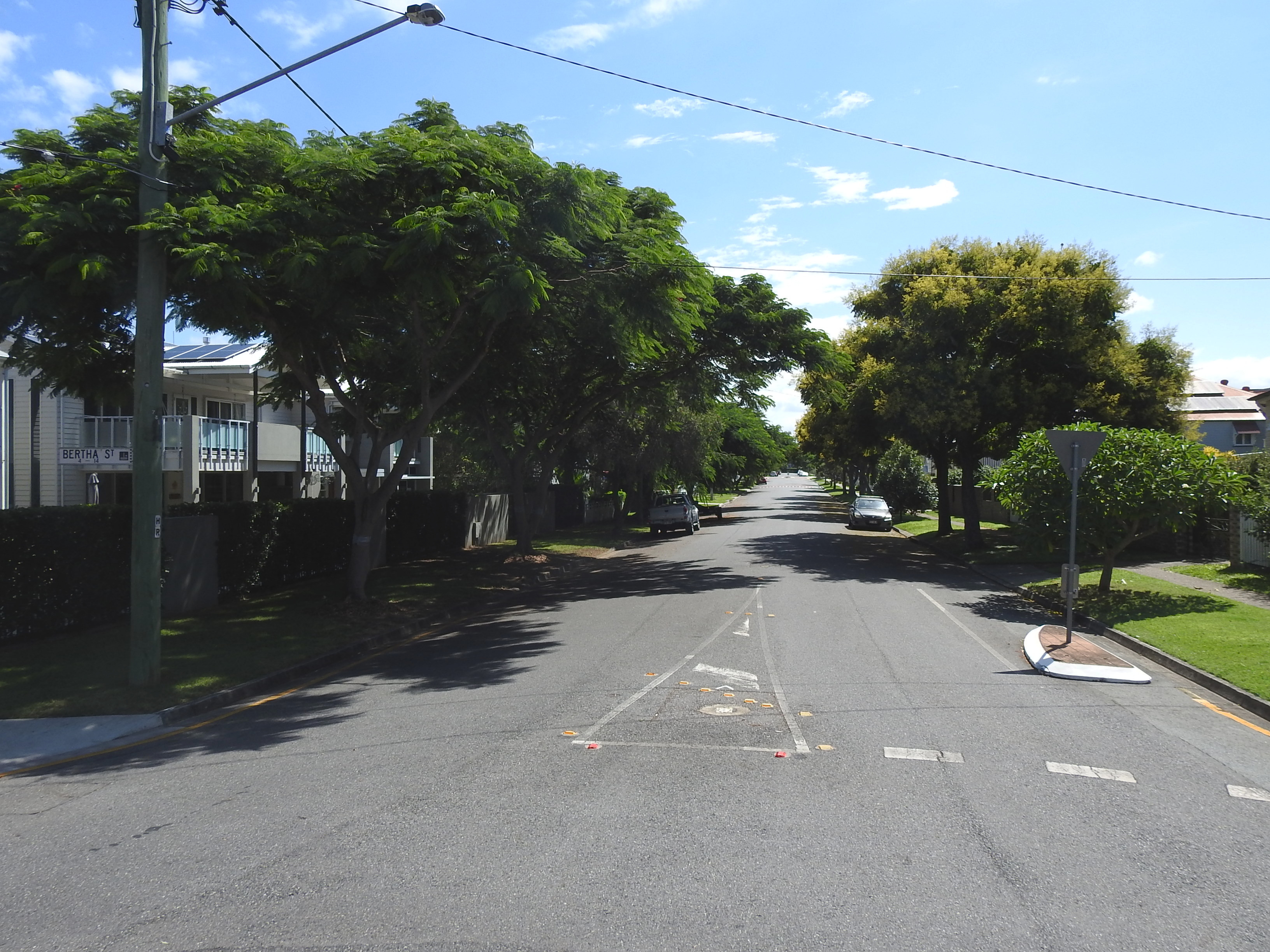
Wide and tree-lined streets along Nelson Street, west from Bertha Street (2021).

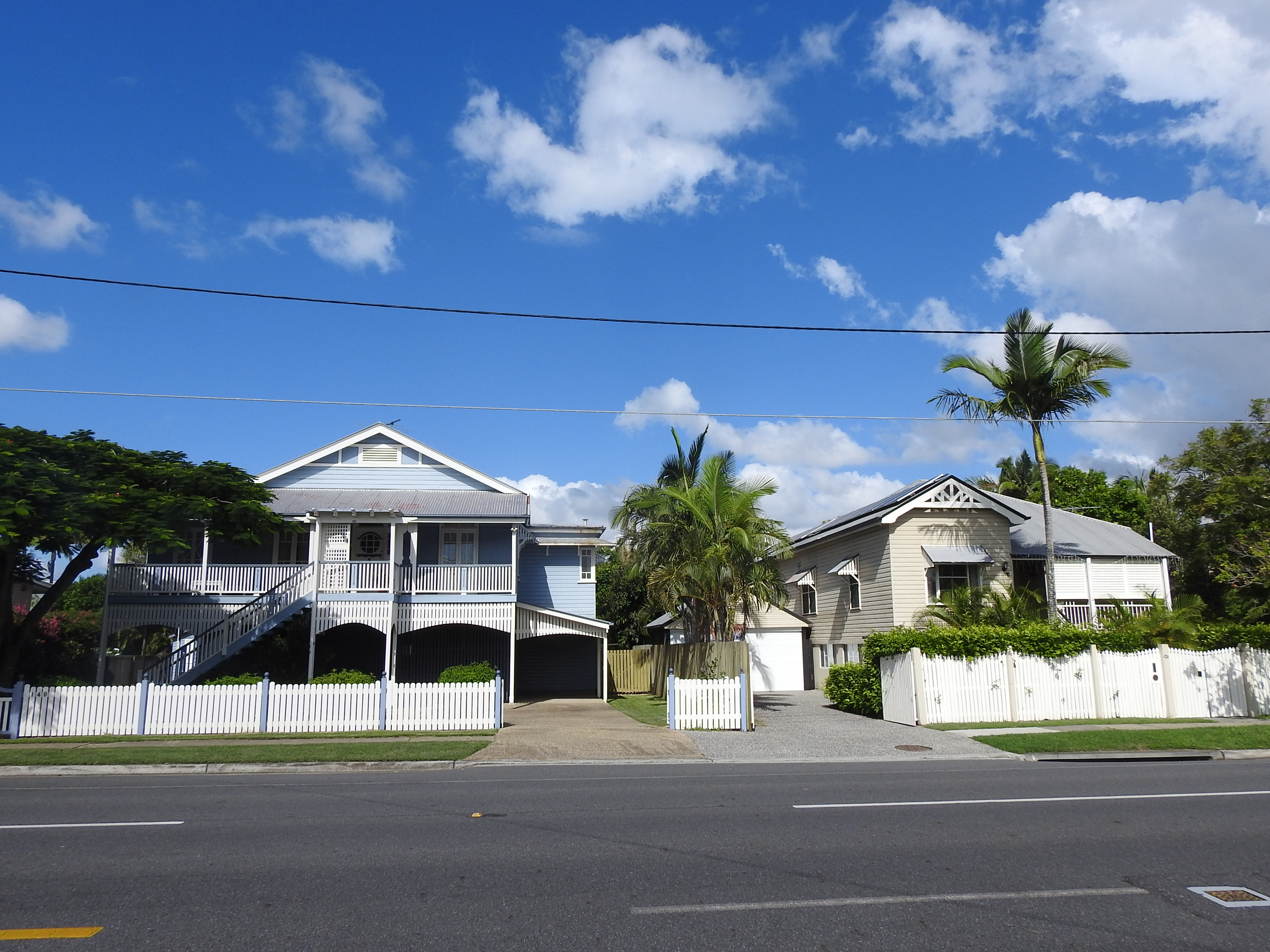
Common housing style around Kalinga, 147–149 Judge Street (2021).

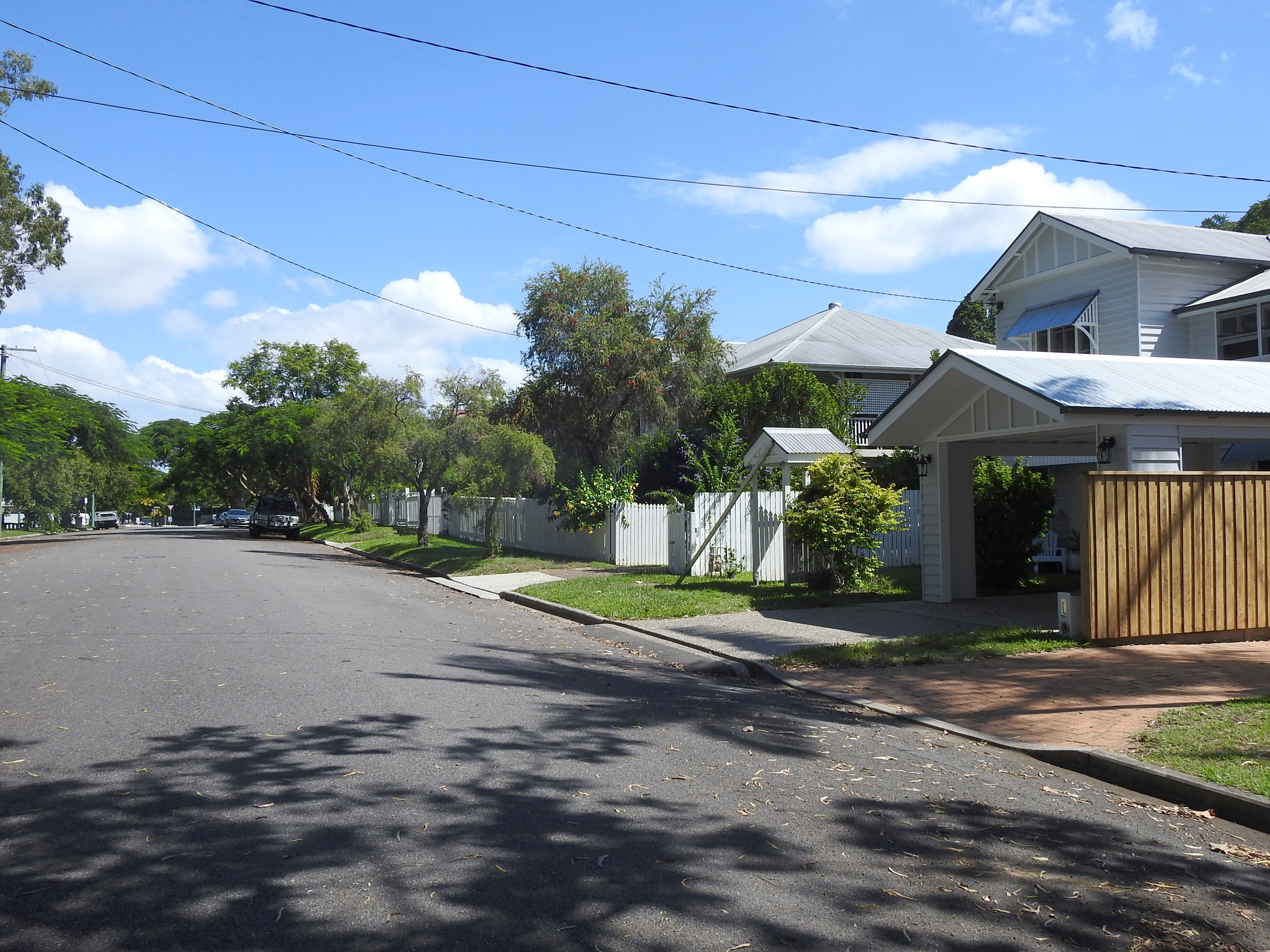
Wide and tree-lined streets, of two-story wooden housing on Bertha Street (2021).

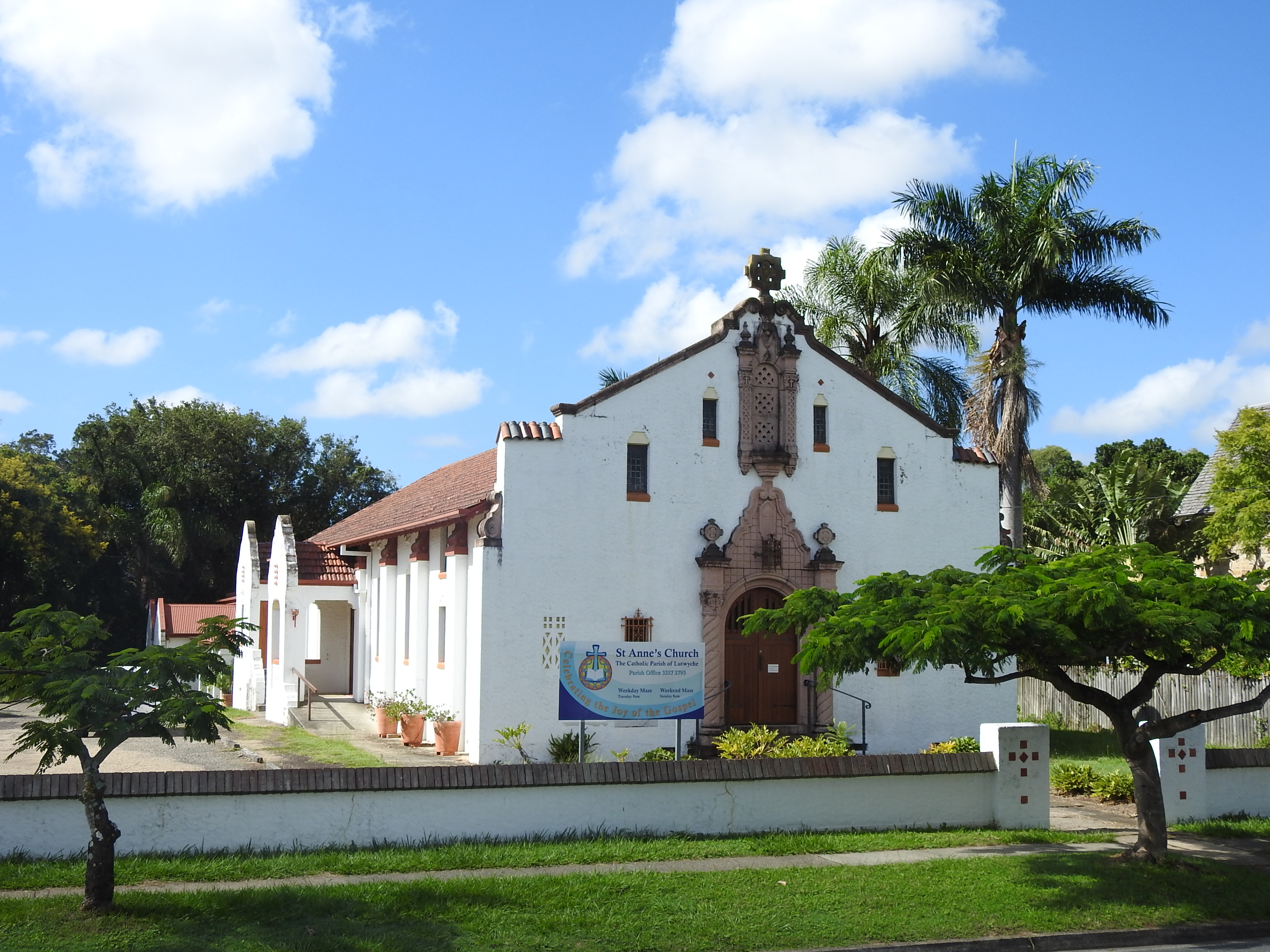
Saint Anne's Catholic Church, 127 Nelson Street (2021).

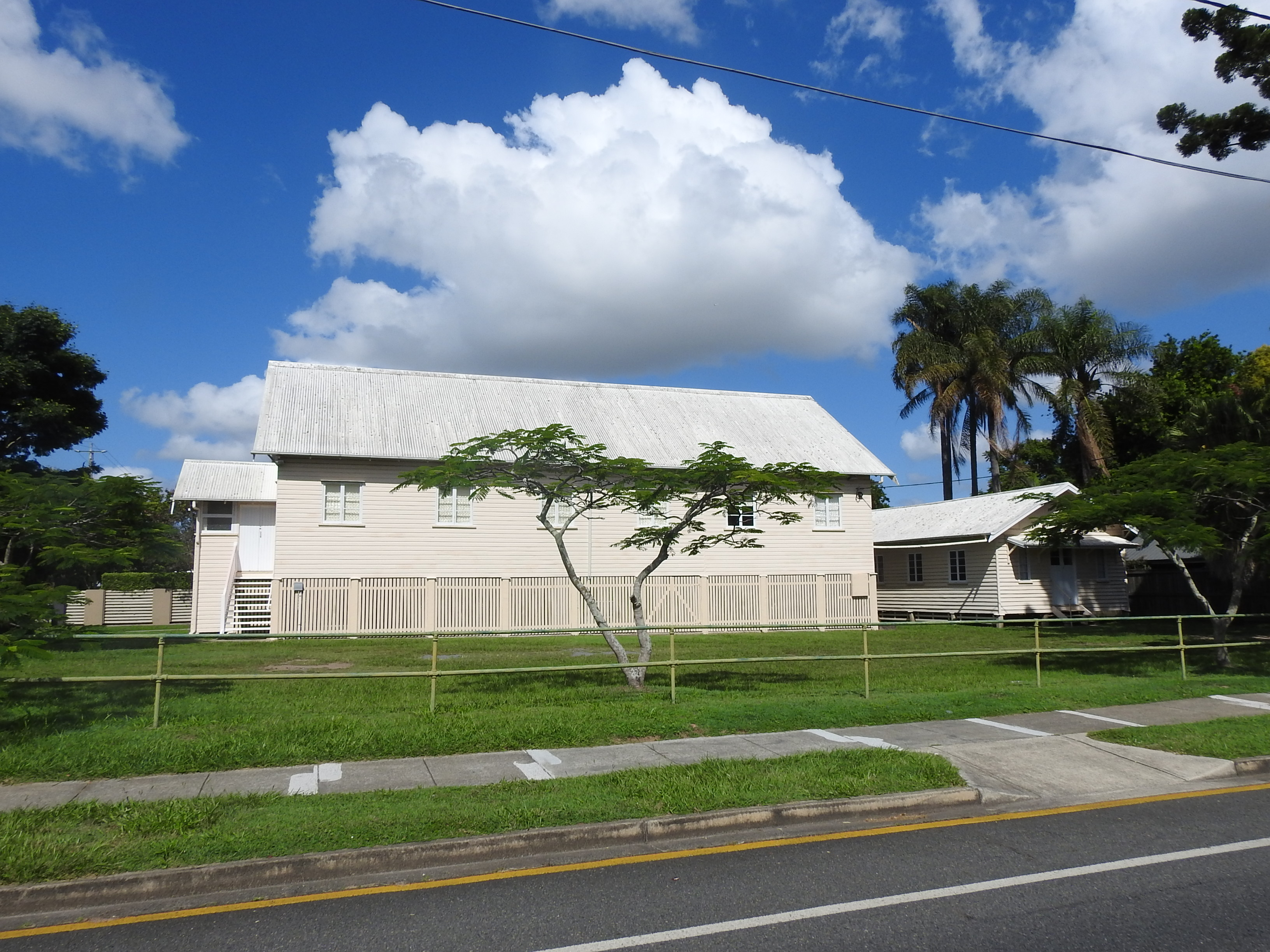
Presbyterian Church of Eastern Australia, 78 Emma Street, from Shaw Road (2021).

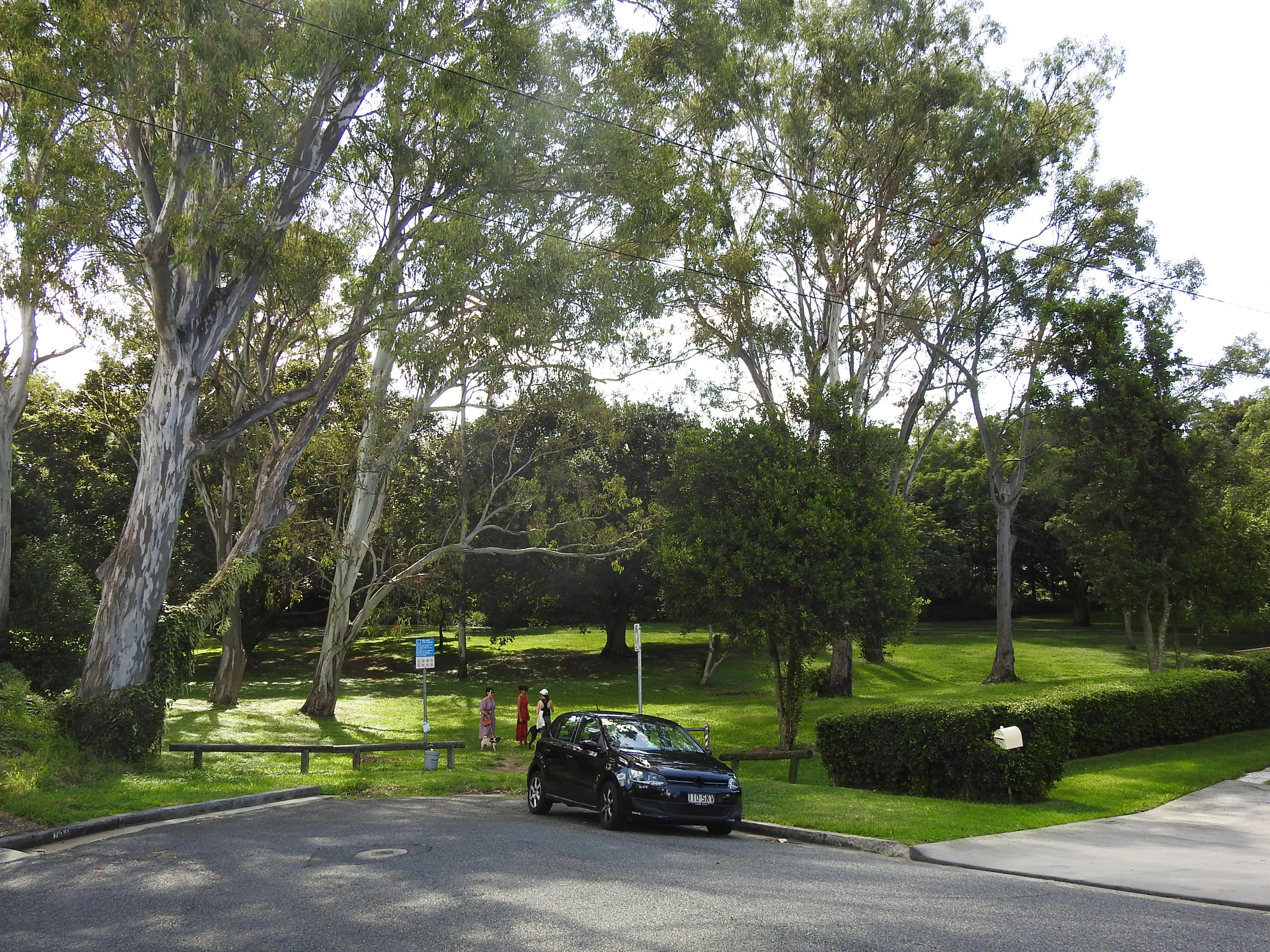
Kedron Brook parkland accessed from Emma Street (2021).

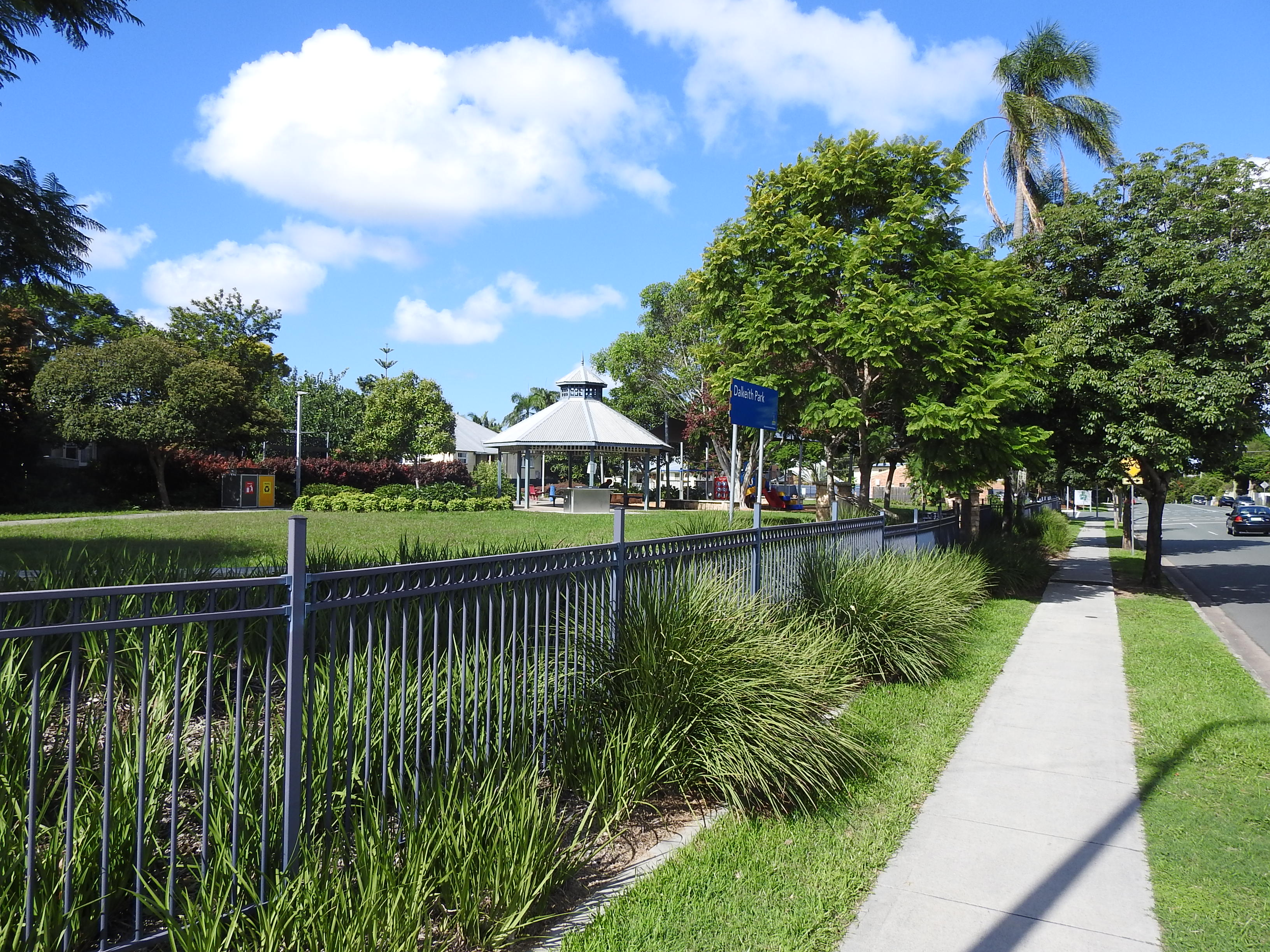
Dalkeith Park, 98 Kent Street with Rose Street (2021).

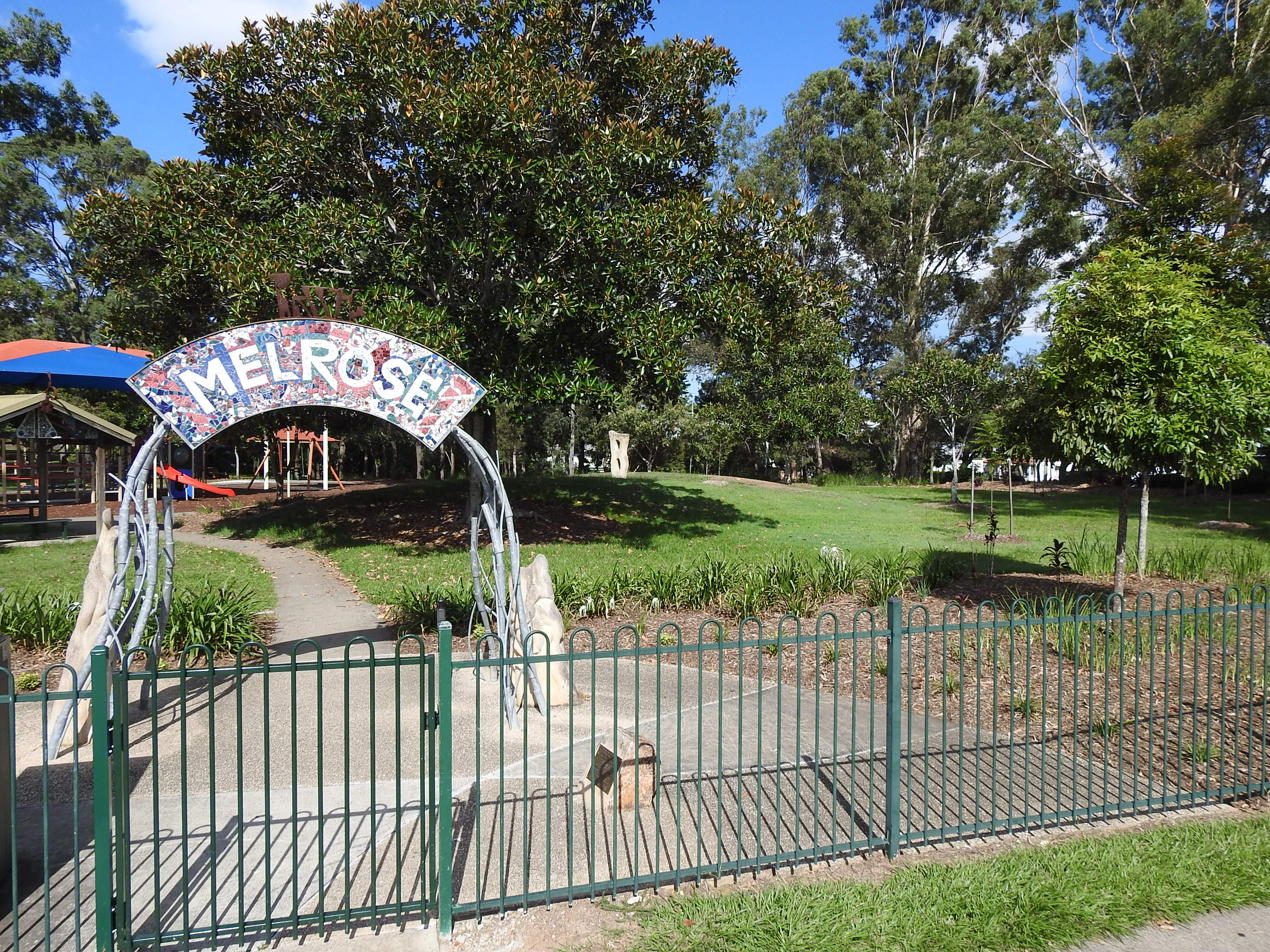
Melrose Park, 76 Rose Street, with skate park, bowls, children's area, and cricket oval (2021).

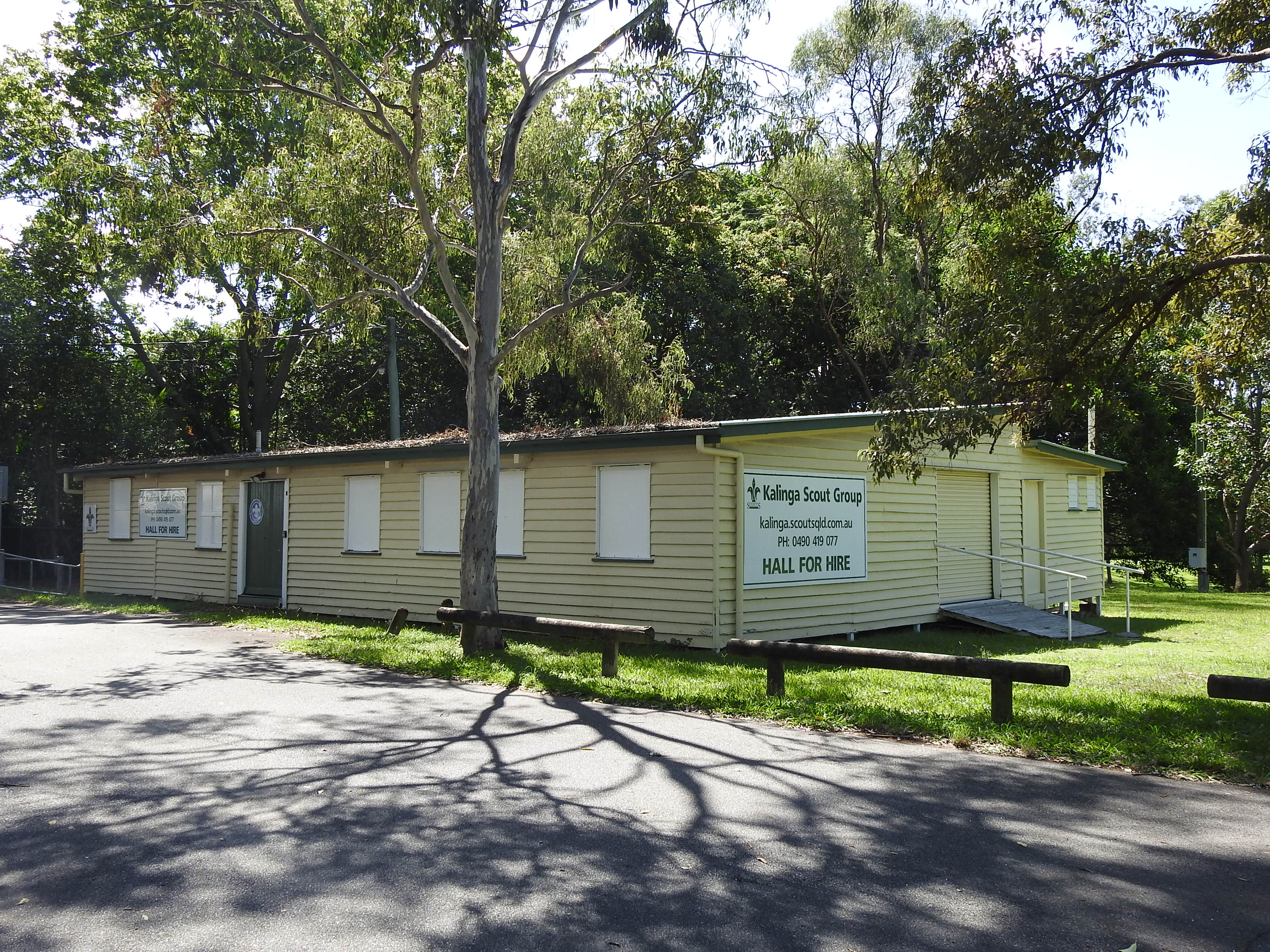
Scout den, Kalinga Park (2021).
