= Kedron Lodge =

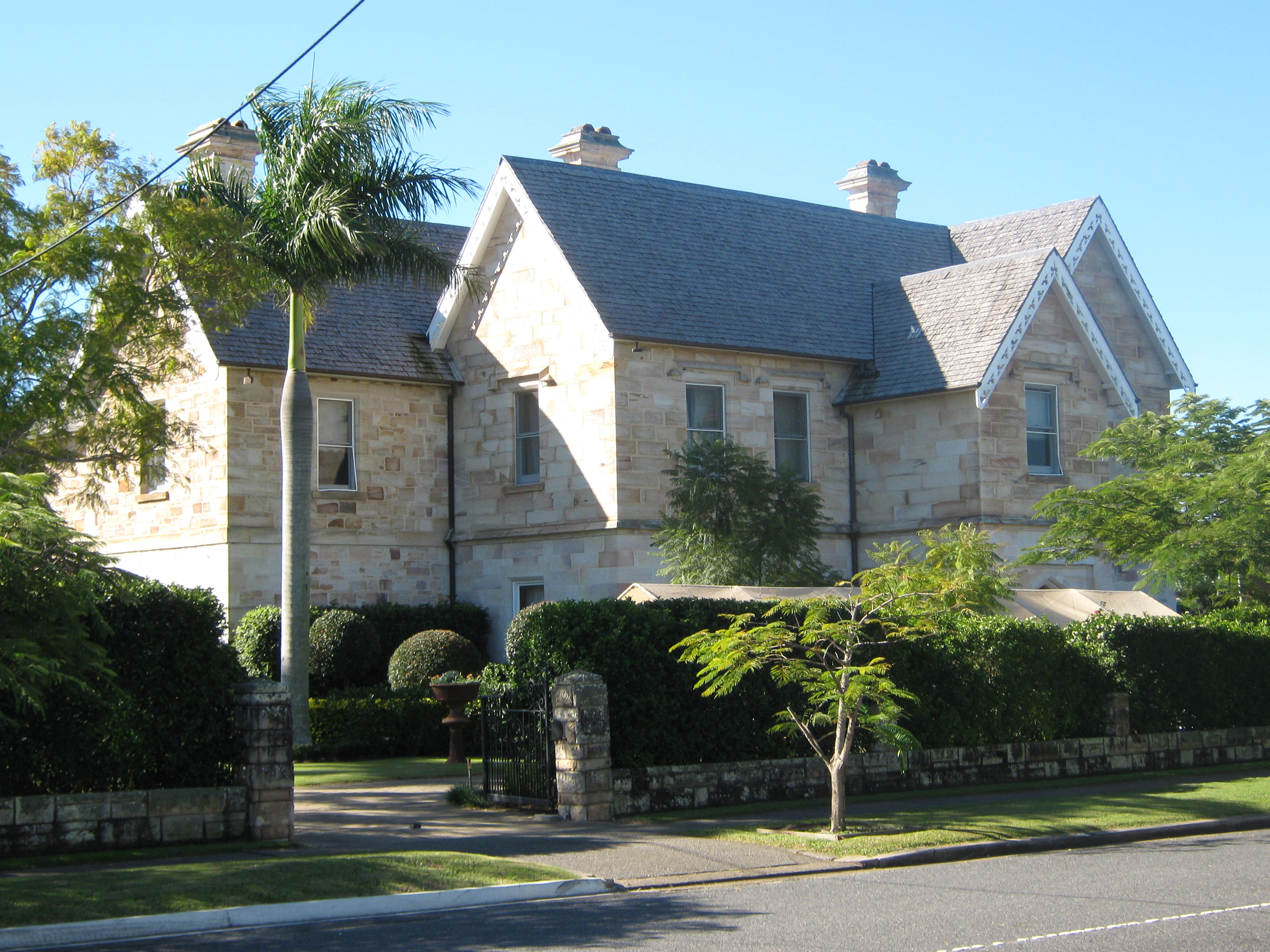
- Kedron Lodge, 2008

- Location within Queensland Location within Australia
- 27.4088°S 153.0448°E
- Location: 123 Nelson Street, Kalinga, City of Brisbane, Queensland, Australia

History
- Design period: 1840s–1860s (mid-19th century)
- Built: 1860 – early 1900s
- Built for: Alfred Lutwyche

Site notes
- Architect: Christopher Porter

Queensland Heritage Register
- Official name: Kedron Lodge
- Type: state heritage (landscape, built)
- Designated: 21 October 1992
- Reference no.: 600238
- Significant period: 1860–1900s (fabric, historical)
- Significant components: service wing, time capsule, ballroom, cellar, residential accommodation – main house, garden/grounds
- Builders: Christopher Porter

Kedron Lodge is a heritage-listed villa at 123 Nelson Street, Kalinga (formerly in Wooloowin), City of Brisbane, Queensland, Australia. It was designed by architect Christopher Porter and was built from 1860 to the early 1900s by John Petrie. It was added to the Queensland Heritage Register on 21 October 1992.

== History ==
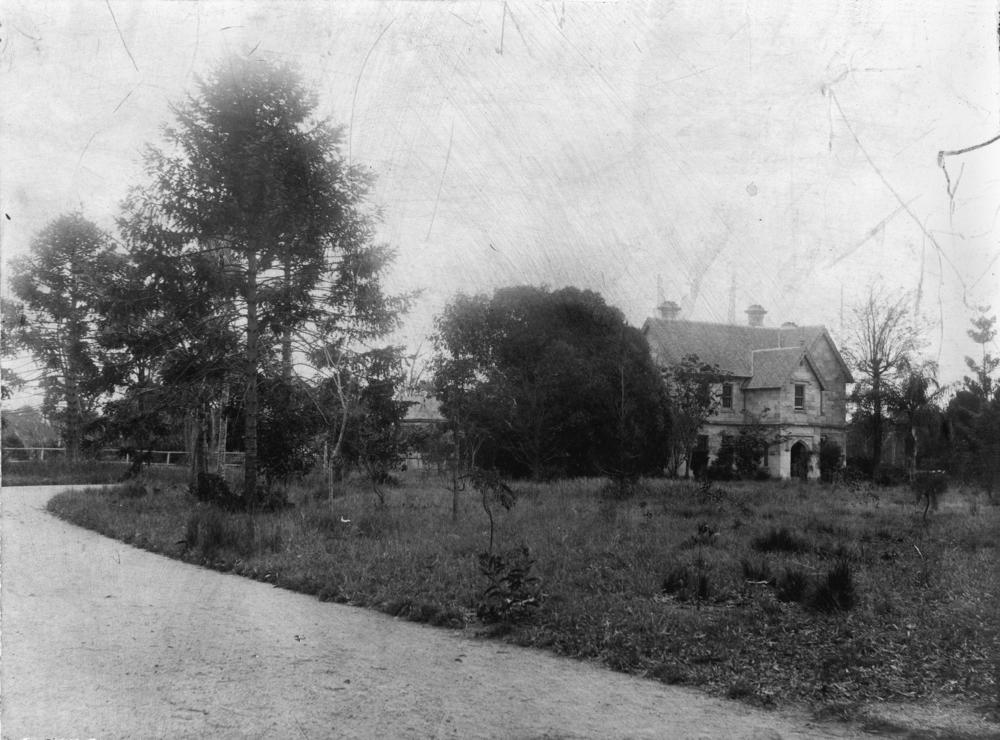
Kedron Lodge, circa 1914

Kedron Lodge was one of the first Brisbane dwellings designed by architect Christopher Porter. It was built by John Petrie, for the first judge of the Queensland Supreme Court, Alfred James Lutwyche (1810–1880). The judge had purchased portion 18 of 35 acres (14 ha) for £35 in January 1860. He established a very viable farm and orchard, and built stables to satisfy his horse-racing interests. He was an acknowledged gourmet and bon-vivant, as well as a leading Anglican and controversial judge.

William Henry Kent, a race-horse owner and grazier, was the next inhabitant from about 1890 to 1905. He added a ballroom to the house, established a noteworthy garden and utilised the stables. In subsequent years Kedron Lodge was rented till purchased by William Walton, who was responsible for the subdivision of the estate.

From 1930 to 1989 the Lodge was owned by the Catholic Church. During this era it was a home for priests, a convent and finally a youth refuge. The subsequent owners returned the home to its former status.

== Description ==
Kedron Lodge is a large two-storeyed dwelling of twenty rooms beside Kedron Brook. Built of sandstone from John Petrie's Albion Quarry, its irregular silhouette is created by several steeply pitched gable roofs and five brick chimneys. Decoration includes traceried bargeboards, window mouldings and the castellated parapet and mouldings on the ground floor faceted bay. The unshaded windows are multi-paned sash. A string course delineates the two floors. The entrance porch leads to a large square-shaped front hall which gives access to the cedar staircase and the cellar. The hall terminates at a longitudinal gallery or hallway that connects the rear wings. Like Toorak House, Kedron Lodge is an excellent example of the two-storeyed Gothic style residence.

The house occupies a corner position. On its left is a Catholic church and behind Kedron Lodge is the church hall. The grounds include a swimming pool but little planting.

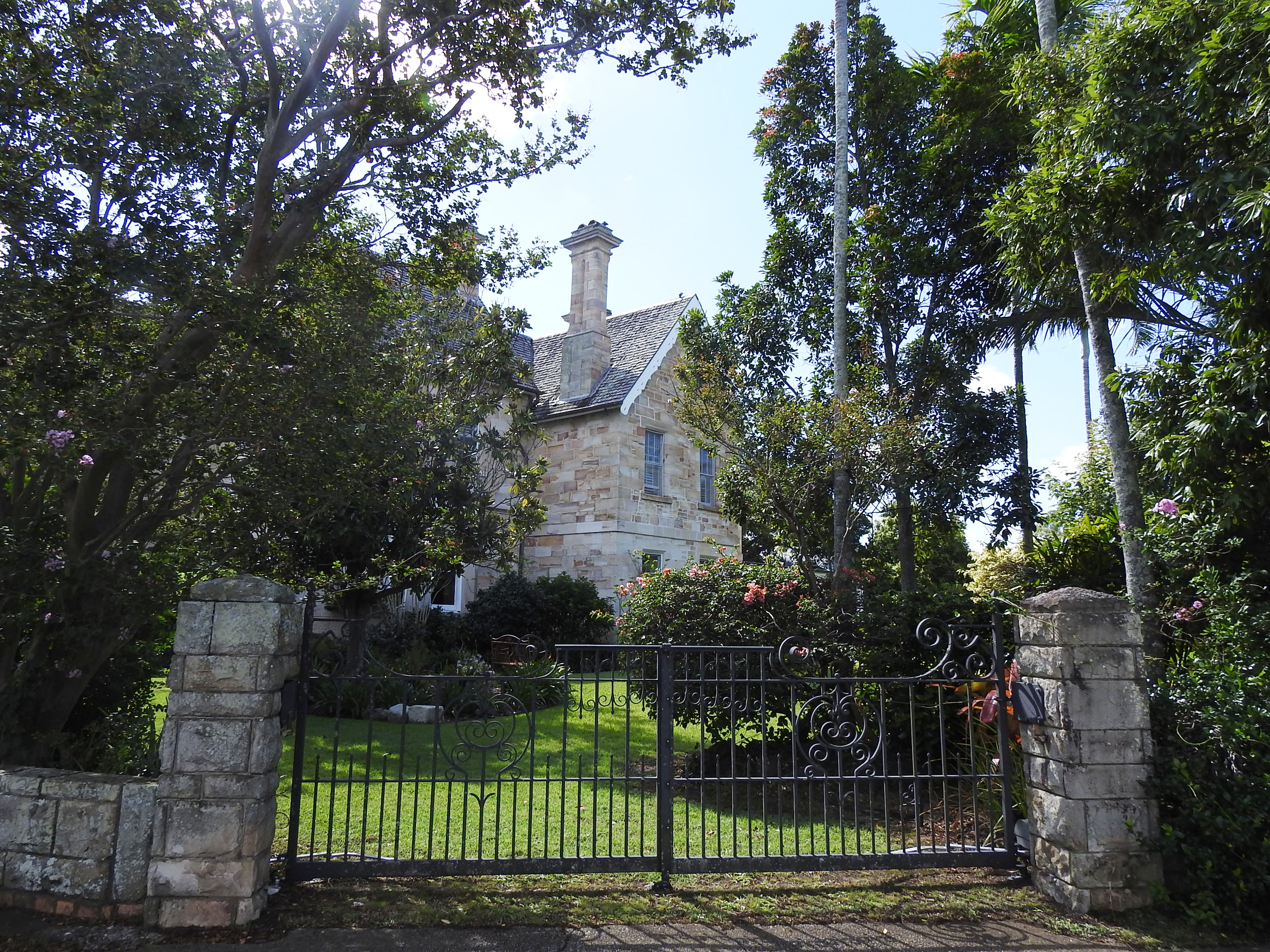
Kedron Lodge residence, from Horton Street corner (2021).

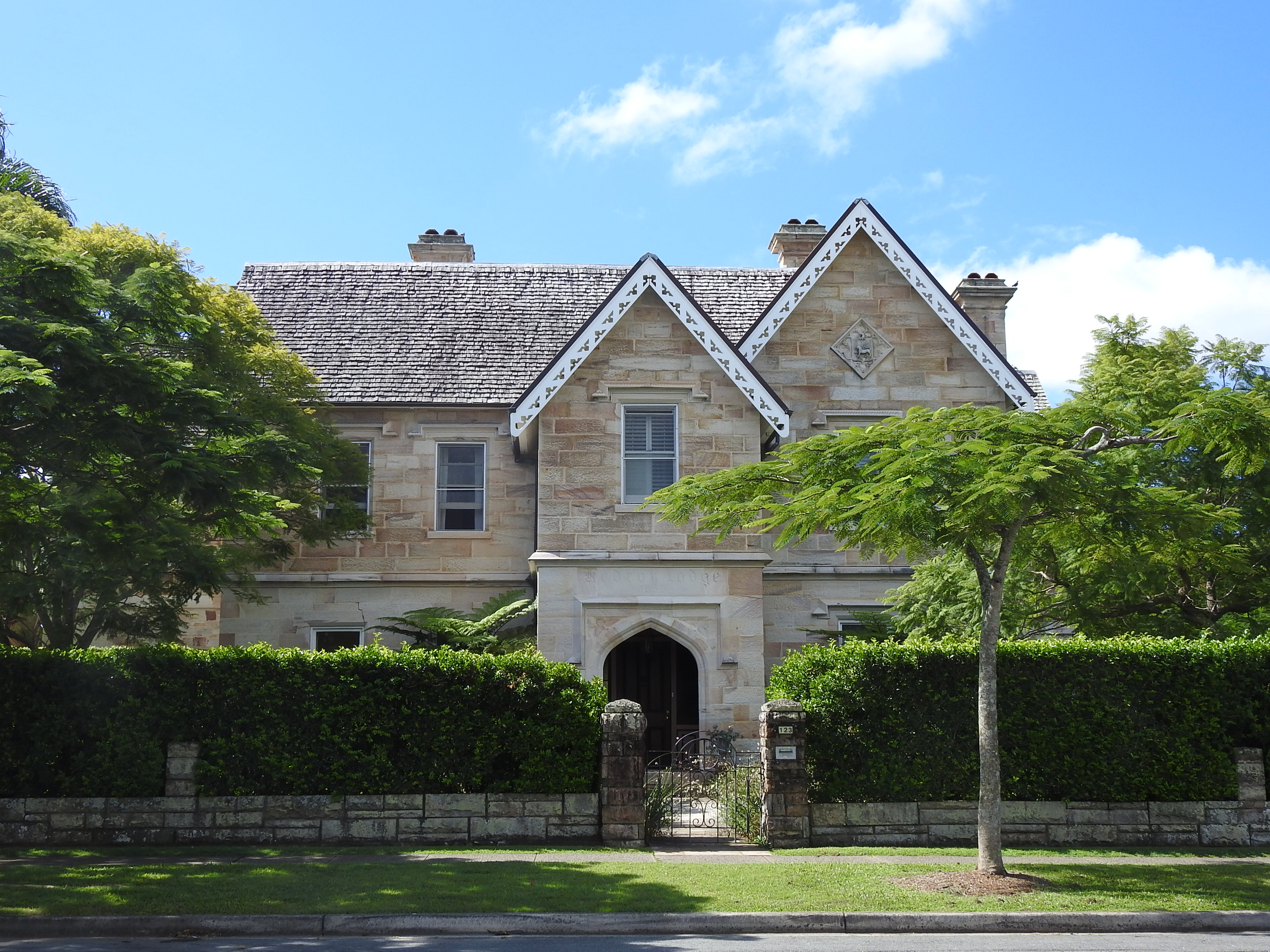
Kedron Lodge residence (2021).

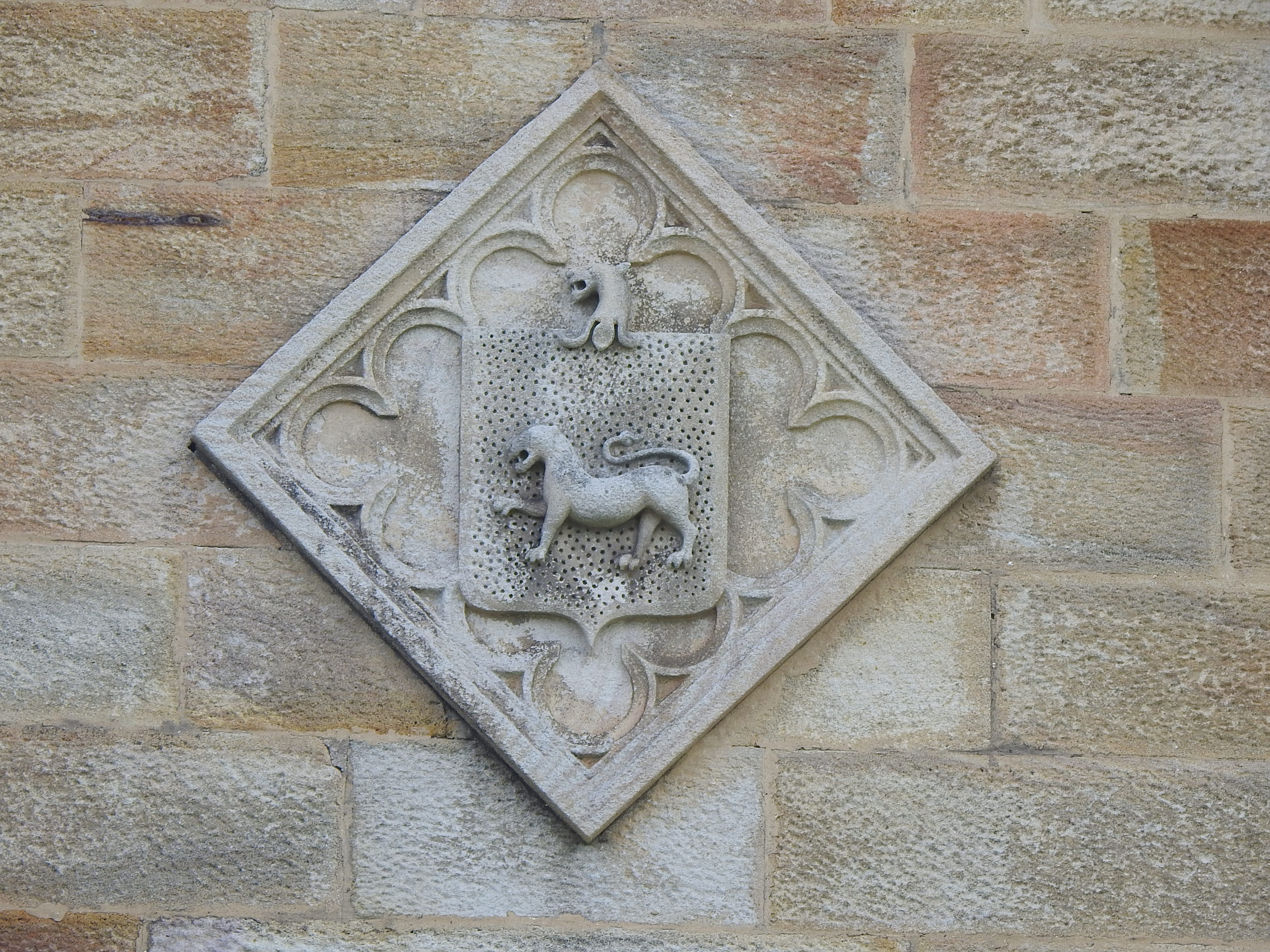
Kedron Lodge residence stonework (2021).

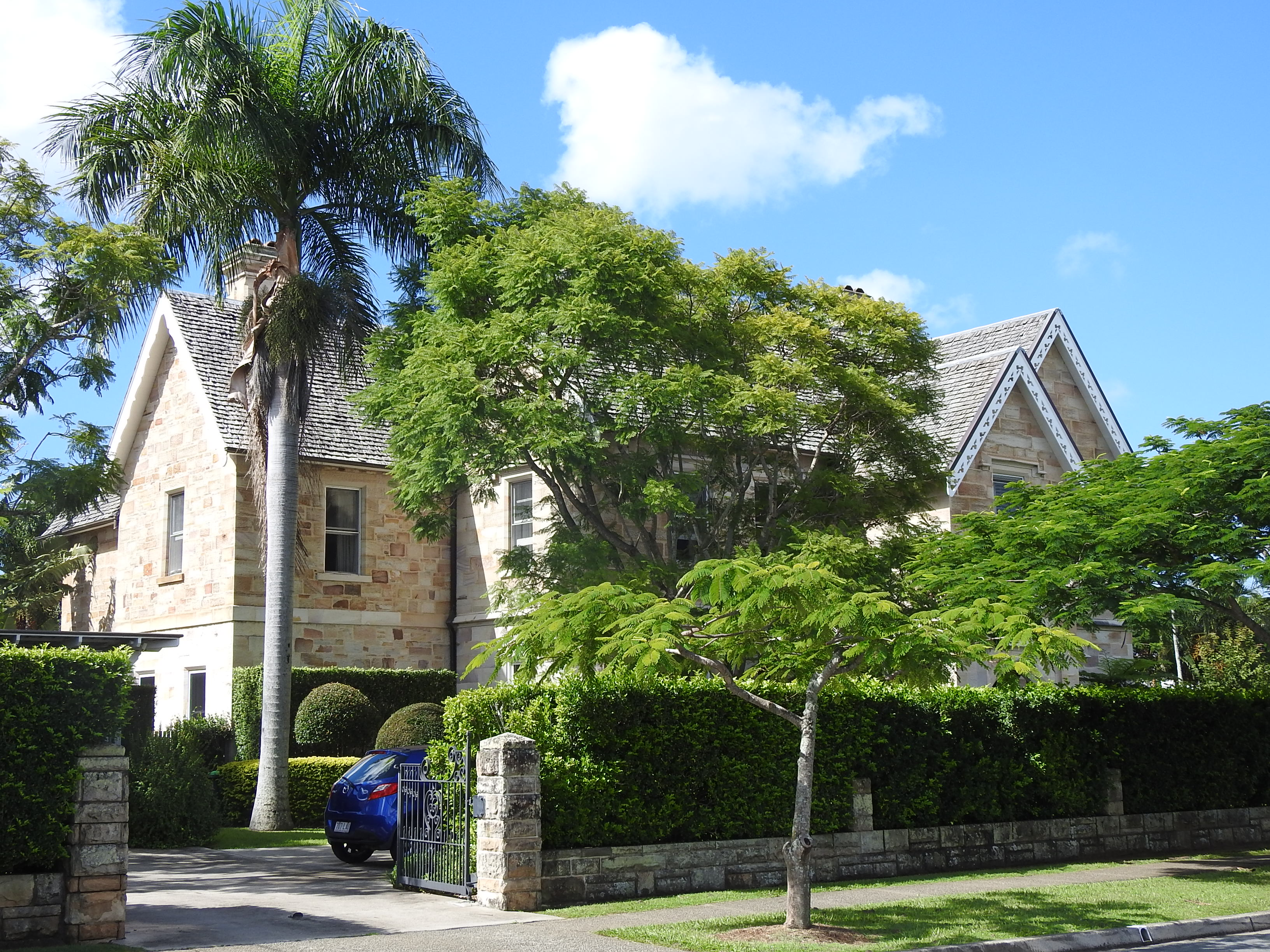
Kedron Lodge residence driveway (2021).

== Heritage listing ==
Kedron Lodge was listed on the Queensland Heritage Register on 21 October 1992 having satisfied the following criteria.

The place is important in demonstrating the evolution or pattern of Queensland's history.

Kedron Lodge is one of the original villa estates which was typical of many which were built on the fringe of Brisbane in the 1860s, but which have suffered since from suburban subdivision.

The place demonstrates rare, uncommon or endangered aspects of Queensland's cultural heritage.

The building is a rare example of a substantial Colonial Gothic house built in stone in the early 1880s by Christopher Per and John Petrie for Judge Lutwyche.

The place is important in demonstrating the principal characteristics of a particular class of cultural places.

The building is a rare example of a substantial Colonial Gothic house built in stone in the early 1880s by Christopher Porter and John Petrie for Judge Lutwyche.

The place is important because of its aesthetic significance.

Designed by less well known architect Christopher Porter and built by premier builder John Petrie, Kedron Lodge has harmonious form, style and fabric.

The place has a special association with the life or work of a particular person, group or organisation of importance in Queensland's history.

Kedron Lodge is also significant as the home of Queensland's first Supreme Court judge after whom the suburb has been named.
