= Christopher Porter (architect) =

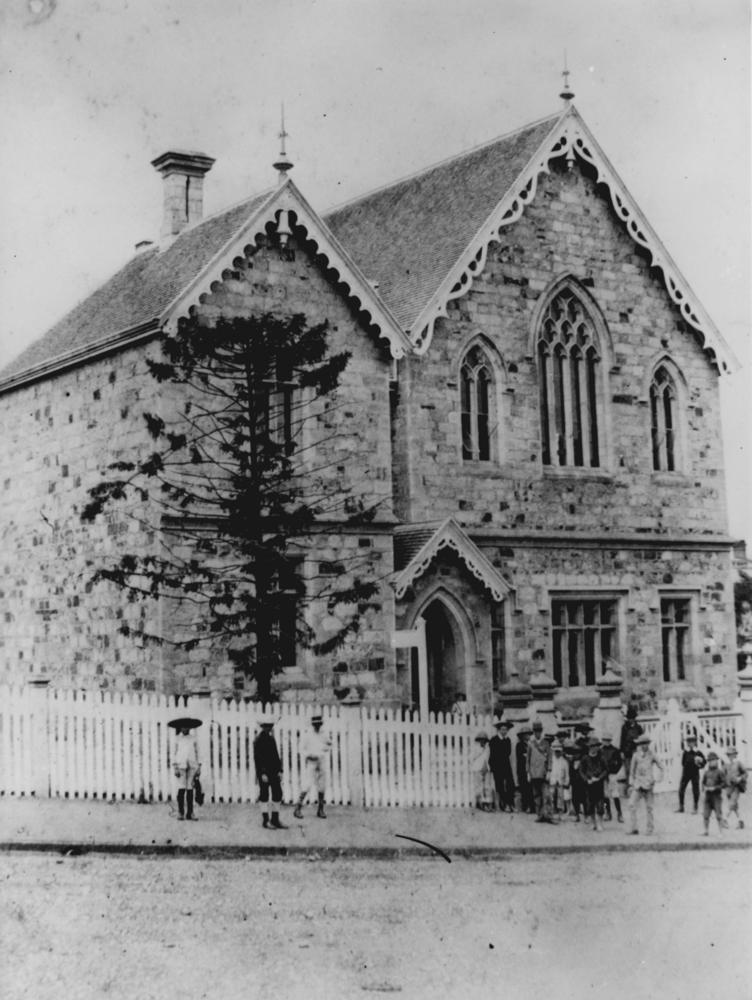
Normal School, Brisbane, circa 1885

Christopher Porter (c. 1801 – 1874) was an architect who was prominent in Geelong, Victoria in the late 1850s and 1860s, and later in Brisbane, Queensland (now within Australia).

Porter migrated to Victoria with his family in 1851, worked as an architect in Geelong and then Brisbane, where he was appointed City Surveyor, and then turned to farming.

He designed:

- Bell & Son Bakery in Geelong
- Geelong Chamber of Commerce building in Moorabool Street in 1858
- Ballarat Chamber of Commerce in 1859
- Kedron Lodge in Brisbane 1860
- Normal School in Brisbane in 1860, becoming the Queensland Board of Education's first general architect
- Ballarat Benevolent Society in 1866

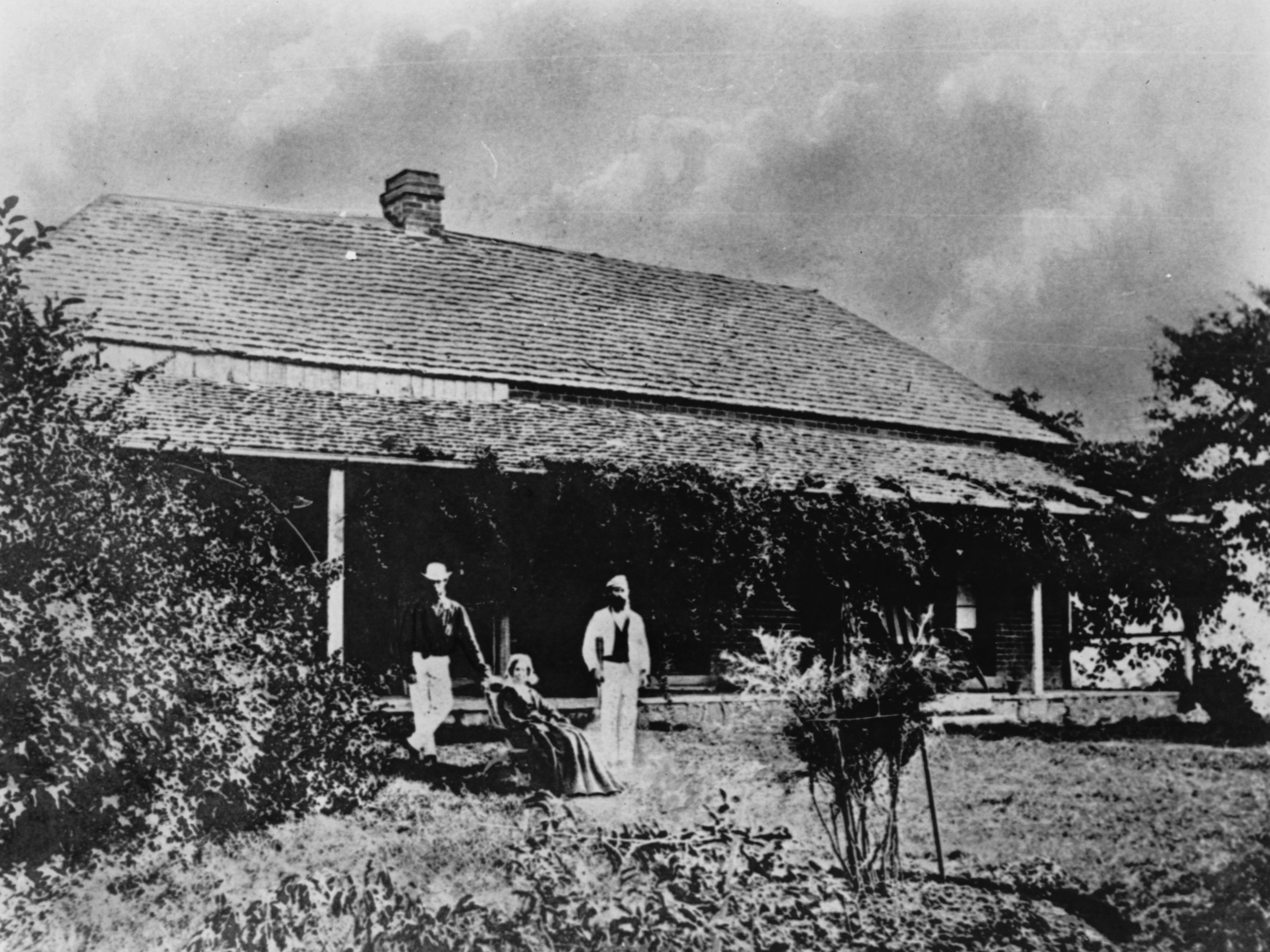
Christopher Porter residence at Doughboy Creek, Murarrie, circa 1872

The Geelong Chamber of Commerce was built by Boynton and Conway, demolished 1955), described as "...a Barrabool freestone building of two storeys with an elaborate facade which included giant Corinthian order columns".

The design of the Normal School was later thought to have included a subtle joke with "[A]ll doorways and windows had wide key stones and copings forming the shape of the dreaded broad arrow of convict days."

Porter also had an interest in a pottery and brickworks for the manufacture of tiles and hollow bricks at Mopoke Gully near Ballarat in the 1860s, which may have been connected to his contracting works.

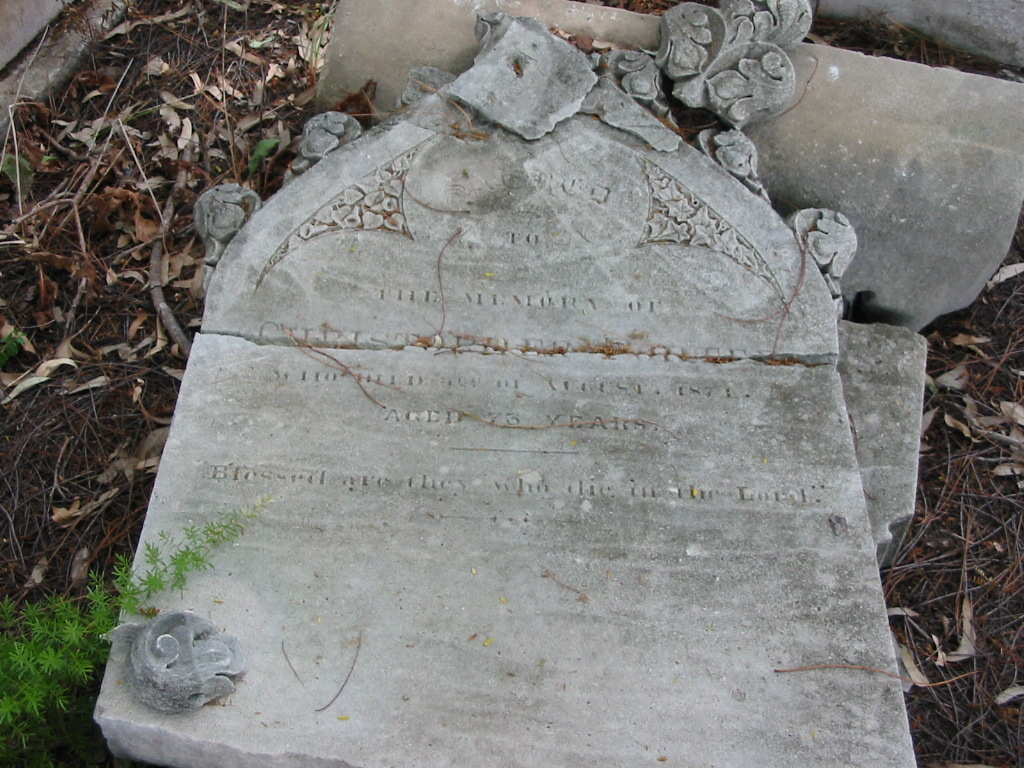
Damaged headstone for Porter in the Christ Church Anglican cemetery, Tingalpa

He lived in his final years at Doughboy Creek (now in Hemmant), and died in 1874, and was buried in Tingalpa Church Cemetery. He lived in his final years at Doughboy Creek, and died in 1874, and was buried in Tingalpa Church Cemetery.
