= Christopher J. H. Porter =

Pharmaceutical scientist

Christopher J.H. Porter
- Other name: Chris Porter
- Education: University of Nottingham (B.Pharm., Ph.D.); Royal College of Pharmacy (MRCPharm)
- Occupation: Pharmaceutical scientist
- Scientific career
- Fields: Pharmaceutical Science; Drug Delivery; Drug Discovery
- Institutions: Monash University

Christopher J.H. Porter is a pharmaceutical scientist and academic with interests in drug discovery and development. He is a Sir John Monash Distinguished Professor at Monash University, Australia, and director of the Monash Institute of Pharmaceutical Sciences (MIPS). His research has focused on drug absorption and bioavailability, the benefits of targeting the lymphatic system, and the development of nanomedicines. His lab developed the Glyph lymph-targeting prodrug technology employed by Seaport Therapeutics.

== Education and career ==
Porter completed his undergraduate and graduate studies at the University of Nottingham. He moved to Australia and joined Monash University in 1992. He later served as associate dean of research in the faculty. He took up the position of director of the Monash Institute of Pharmaceutical Sciences in 2017. He was appointed a Sir John Monash Distinguished Professor in 2024.

Porter is a co-Chair of Melbourne Therapeutics, a Melbourne Biomedical Precinct group. He is the Monash chair of the Research domain of PharmAlliance, a partnership between the pharmacy schools at Monash University, University College London, and the University of North Carolina at Chapel Hill established in 2015.

== Research ==
Porter's research has focused on understanding the mechanisms of drug absorption and the formulation strategies employed to enhance absorption. A focus has been on drug absorption into the lymphatic system and the intestinal lymphatic transport of lipophilic compounds, and the oral delivery of poorly water-soluble drugs, specifically on lipid-based formulations.

Porter's work on the intestinal lymphatic transport of drugs has examined how lipophilic drugs and prodrugs are co-absorbed with dietary lipids, incorporated into lipoproteins such as chylomicrons during lipid digestion, and transported through the mesenteric lymphatic system, thereby providing a pathway that can reduce first-pass hepatic metabolism and provide a strategy for delivering drugs to lymph-resident tissues to facilitate immune modulation. His studies showed that conjugation to glyceride-mimetic structures to form prodrugs that mimic dietary triglycerides can significantly enhance intestinal lymphatic transport. In particular, his research led to the development of triglyceride (TG)-mimetic lymph-directing prodrugs incorporating self-immolative linkers that enhance intestinal lymphatic transport while enabling the release of the parent drug, a technology that was licensed to Seaport Therapeutics and underpins the Glyph delivery technology that is employed in Seaport Therapeutics' clinical pipeline

Porter also studied the use of lipids and lipidic excipients to improve the absorption of lipophilic drugs and employed in vitro lipid digestion models, including modified pH-stat lipolysis assays, to predict the fate of drugs after lipolysis and to evaluate the in vitro performance of lipid-based formulations. His group showed that lipase-mediated digestion of lipid formulations can generate transient supersaturation, a phenomenon associated with improved oral drug absorption. He was one of the leaders of Lipid Formulation Classification System (LFCS) Consortium, which developed standardized methods for evaluating lipid-based drug delivery systems. In a 2007 review in Nature Reviews Drug Discovery with Natalie Trevaskis and William Charman, he described the use of lipid-based formulations enhance oral bioavailability, including the formation of colloidal species during digestion that promote drug solubilization and enhance intestinal absorption.

Porter collaborated with Starpharma to develop PEGylated polylysine dendrimer-based drug delivery systems, resulting in patents related to the DEP drug delivery platform. He also co-developed ionic liquid technologies that use lipophilic counter-ions to enhance drug solubility in lipid formulations, which were acquired by Capsugel.

== Awards and honors ==
- 2009 – Lipid-based Drug Delivery Outstanding Research Award, American Association of Pharmaceutical Scientists (AAPS)
- 2013 – Monash Honour Roll, Monash University
- 2014 – Fellow, AAPS
- 2015, 2016, 2018, 2024 – Highly Cited Researcher, Clarivate Analytics
- 2017 – APSA Medallist, Australasian Pharmaceutical Sciences Association (APSA)
- 2019 – Leadership Fellow, National Health and Medical Research Council (NHMRC)
- Fellow – Royal Australian Chemical Institute
