= Kedron =

Kedron may refer to:

== Places ==
=== Australia ===
- Kedron Brook, a creek that flows through the northern suburbs of Brisbane, Queensland
- Kedron, Queensland, a suburb of Brisbane, Queensland
  - Kedron State High School, a secondary school

=== United States ===
- Kedron Creek, a stream in Minnesota, United States
- Kedron, West Virginia, United States

== Other uses ==
- Kedron of Alexandria, an early patriarch of the Orthodox Church at Alexandria
- An alternative name of Kentro in Greece and in modern transliteration of Greek meaning centre
- An Intel PRO/Wireless 4965AGN IEEE 802.11 a/b/g/n mini-PCIe WiFi adapter, part of the Santa Rosa Platform

== See also ==
- Kidron (disambiguation)
