= Montville Memorial Precinct =

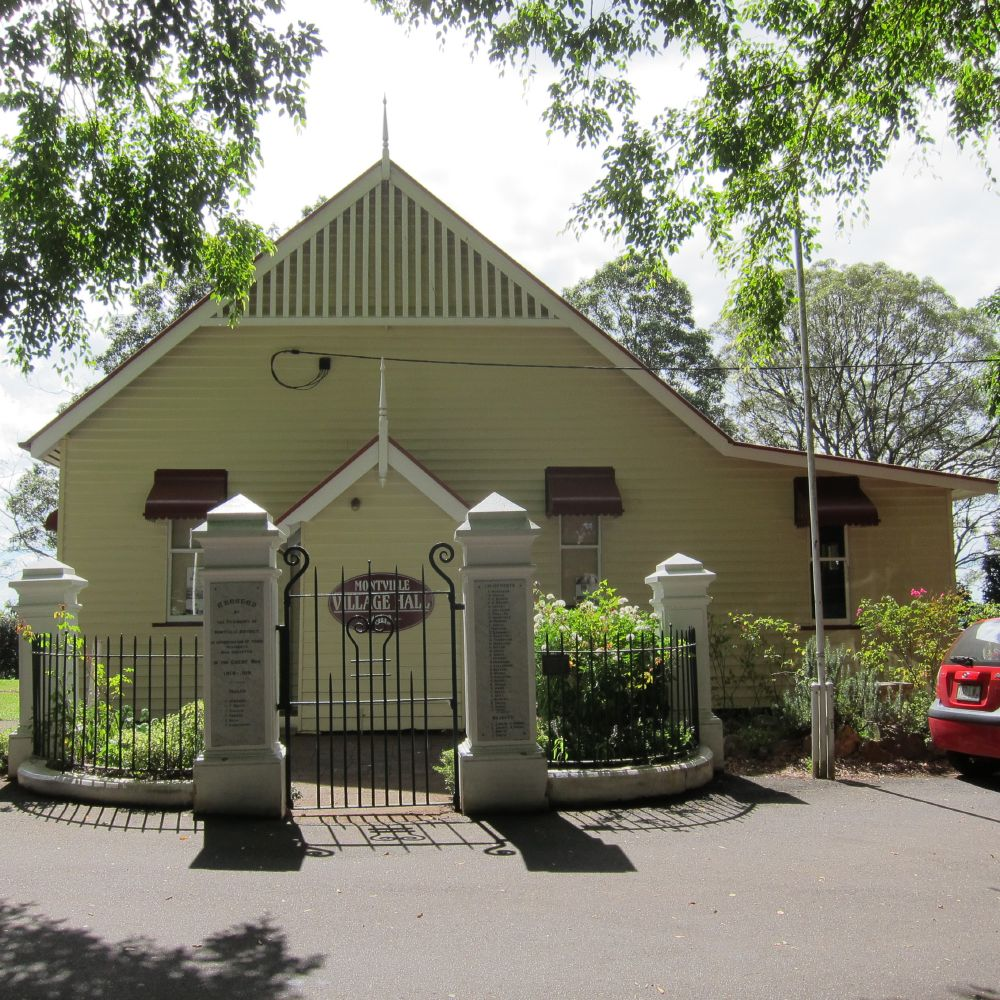
- Montille Memorial Precinct, 2014

- Location within Queensland
- 26.6882°S 152.8927°E
- Location: Razorback Road and Main Street (Montville–Mapleton Road), Montville, Sunshine Coast Region, Queensland, Australia

Queensland Heritage Register
- Official name: Montville Memorial Precinct
- Type: state heritage (built, landscape)
- Designated: 28 August 2008
- Reference no.: 602616
- Significant period: 1900s

Montville Memorial Precinct is a heritage-listed memorial precinct at Razorback Road and Main Street (Montville–Mapleton Road), Montville, Sunshine Coast Region, Queensland, Australia. It was added to the Queensland Heritage Register on 28 August 2008.

== History ==
The Montville Memorial Precinct is located in the village of Montville in the Blackall Range west of the Sunshine Coast. Each element of the precinct has a war memorial function and the place is the setting for annual Anzac Day ceremonies. The memorial gates (1921), commemorating World War I servicemen, form an entrance into Montville Hall (1903) from Memorial Close. The hall contains two memorial honour boards commemorating servicemen from both world wars. Opposite the memorial gates and abutting the Close, a park known locally as the "Village Green" contains six memorial trees (1923) and a former Soldiers' Memorial Hall (1941) (now Montville Memorial Hall, St Mary's Church Hall and Community Centre). The precinct is located at the intersection of Main Street (Montville-Mapleton Road) and Razorback Road.

The men from Montville who served in World War I came from a community of about fifty-five farmers and dairymen and their families. The settlement had developed some twenty years earlier at the head of Razorback Road which, at the time, was the main means of access from Palmwoods into this part of the Blackall Range. From 1891, when the North Coast railway line came to Palmwoods, it provided a route to the railhead for the fruit growers, dairymen and timber getters of the district. A school was established at the head of the road in 1896 and nearby properties were subdivided into small blocks. By World War I, Montville village had a School of Arts Hall (now Montville Hall), a guesthouse and two stores.

About forty men enlisted from Montville's small community; of these six died. Like most communities throughout Australia during the 1920s, Montville erected memorials to its servicemen after the war. As well as honouring those who had volunteered for service, war memorials provided an important focus for collective grieving especially at annual memorial services such as Remembrance Day and Anzac Day. They served as a local expression of patriotism and national identity.

Montville's memorial gates were unveiled on Armistice Day, 11 November 1921. They comprised four Helidon stone pillars supporting wrought iron gates and a fence. Lead filled inscriptions of the names of all the local men who enlisted were engraved on marble slabs mounted on the gate pillars.

The gates were made by AL Petrie and Son, Queensland's most prolific maker of memorials during that period. Andrew Lang Petrie, was a grandson of Andrew Petrie, Superintendent of Works during Moreton Bay's penal period, and a son of John Petrie, Brisbane's first mayor. He was a leading citizen of Brisbane who held a seat in the Queensland Legislative Assembly for thirty-three years. Other monuments in southeast Queensland made by the company include war memorial gates at Kalinga Park (1920), Kallangur (1923) and Chermside (1924) and other types of memorials such as the Ipswich Railway Workshops War Memorial (1919), Graceville Memorial Park (1920), and Toowong Memorial Park (1922).

Montville's memorial gates are rare in Queensland and in Australia in that they include the names of those who volunteered for service but were rejected. War memorials often recorded the names of both those who returned from service during war and those who died. By the absence of names on a monument, these memorials also identified those who did not volunteer for service. This was especially true in small towns like Montville where everyone in the community was known. To avoid unfair public disapprobation, associations of rejected volunteers often petitioned to have their names included on memorials, usually without success. While the names of volunteers who were rejected do appear on a number of honour boards, it is rare for them to appear on monuments as they do at Montville.

The memorial gates are the focal point of annual Anzac Day services at Montville. The adjacent Memorial Close, memorial trees and Montville Hall perform functions in these services as well as being important elements in the setting of the gates. The close, shaded by the memorial trees, provides a wide, open area where members of the community gather to participate in the dawn ceremony. Afterwards, Anzac biscuits and refreshments are served in the hall, where veterans may also play the traditional "two-up" game. Rolls of honour for both world wars are mounted on the wall.

Montville Hall, completed on 23 February 1903, predated World War I by more than ten years but it was a logical choice for the site of the gates since, together with the "Village Green", it was the centre of community activities; a role it continues to play. It was built by Robert Whitecross to plans and specifications prepared by William Skene, a local farmer.

A number of alterations have been made to the hall since its construction. Between 1915 and 1921 it was lengthened by about one third. A supper room and verandah incorporating a kitchen annex was added to the eastern side during the 1950s. In 1999, a large rear extension was built incorporating a dressing room, stage lighting, store-room, toilets and an upgraded kitchen.

Opposite the hall and memorial gates, a line of six memorial trees grow on the "Village Green" along Memorial Close. They are in the tradition of memorial avenues. The first of these in Australia were planted in Victoria. During the war, the State Recruiting Committee in Victoria recommended that each intending recruit should be given the assurance that his name would be memorialised in an avenue of honour. By 1918, Ballarat was committed to nearly 4,000 plaqued trees. In southeast Queensland there are a number of memorial avenues including Anzac Memorial Avenue between Petrie and Redcliffe, Diggers Drive at Kalinga Park, and memorial avenues in Graceville Memorial Park and at the Eumundi War Memorial.

Montville's memorial trees were planted by children from the nearby Montville State School as an Arbour Day project in September 1923. The school had been planting Arbour Day trees since before World War I and by the 1920s available room within the school grounds was becoming restricted. This prompted the decision by Arthur Suthers, Head Teacher of the school in 1923, to arrange for six figs (Ficus benjamina) to be planted as a memorial opposite the memorial gates. Each of the trees bears a plaque naming one of the six local men who died during World War I.

The former Soldiers' Memorial Hall is located on the opposite side of the Village Green to the memorial trees. Memorial halls were a popular form of utilitarian memorial. They were often used as a clubroom for returned soldiers and sometimes also functioned as a community hall.

The Soldiers' Memorial Hall was built in 1941 under the auspices of the Montville sub-branch of the Returned Soldiers', Sailors' and Airmen's Imperial League of Australia (RSSAILA, now RSL) by veterans of World War I as a club room for returned soldiers. In seeking a grant of crown land on which to build the hall, the builders cited the need to provide support for World War II servicemen when they returned. As home to the local sub-branch of the RSL, it functioned as a clubroom for local veterans until 1978 when it was donated to St Mary's Church of England and renamed Montville Memorial Hall, St Mary's Church Hall and Community Centre. Since construction, a kitchen has been added. The verandah was built in August 1995.

It is not unusual for a number of war memorials to be sited in close proximity. The best-known example is Anzac Square in Brisbane, where a number of monuments are located in proximity to the Shrine of Remembrance. Memorial gates are also often found in juxtaposition with memorial avenues in parks, where they often form the entrance to the avenue. Examples of this type include Kalinga Park and Toowong Memorial Park. However, the Montville Precinct, containing memorial gates, trees, hall, close and honour rolls, is unusual for the variety of memorial types in close proximity.

== Description ==
The Montville Memorial Precinct is a leafy area centred on a small park known locally as the "Village Green". As well as this park, it comprises a short street called Memorial Close, memorial gates, a row of memorial fig trees (Ficus sp), a large community hall known as Montville Hall, and a smaller community hall known as the Montville Memorial Hall, St Mary's Church Hall and Community Centre. The precinct is located in the commercial centre of Montville, a village in the hinterland of the Sunshine Coast.

=== Montville Hall ===
Located at the northern edge of the precinct, Montville Hall is a weatherboard hall. The core of the building has a gabled corrugated iron roof with three ventilators; a wide extension along the eastern side has a skillion roof. A rear extension has a lower narrower gabled roof. The hall is sited on land that slopes gently to the rear so that the front is at ground level and the rear is elevated on stumps.

The wide gable of the roof is the most prominent feature of the front elevation. The apex of the gable is in-filled with slatted boards. Access through the front of the hall is gained via a small porch with a gabled, corrugated iron roof. Doors open into either side of this porch. Sash windows open into the hall, one on either side of the porch and a third in the front of the side extension.

A row of horizontally hinged timber framed windows opens from the long eastern elevation. A short ramp running parallel to the side of the building leads to a double timber door located approximately in the middle of the elevation. A metal hood shades this door.

The long western elevation is broken at the rear by a short projecting extension. A row of tall sash windows are spaced evenly along the elevation in front of this and a double wooden door shaded with a metal hood opens towards the front. The extension has high, small square windows. A short staircase to a landing provides access to a wooden door into the north elevation of the extension. The door is shaded by a metal hood.

Most of the interior of the building is taken up with a large hall. At the end of this hall is a stage recessed into the rear wall. The hall has a coved ceiling. The walls are lined with vertically jointed boards and the ceiling is lined with boards running the length of the hall. Photographs and honour boards are arranged around the walls.

A large World War I honour board made of dark stained timber with gold lettering is mounted on the eastern wall near the front of the hall. The top of the board is surmounted with ornate scrolled work. On this top section are the words: "For King and Country. Roll of Honour." The main part of the board is divided into three sections in each of which is listed the names of those who enlisted for World War I. Across the top of this section are the words, "Montville District".

The slightly larger World War II honour board is located next to the World War I board. It is also made of dark stained timber and has gold lettering. It is square in shape and less ornate than the World War I board. It is divided into a rectangular top section and a much larger lower section listing the names of the enlisted in three columns. The words "Montville and District, Roll of Honour, World War 1939-1945" appear in the top section. The four dead are listed at the top of the centre column of names in the lower section. The names are surrounded by a wreath and surmounted with the words "Lest We Forget". The centre column also lists local women who served in World War II.

The eastern extension takes the form of a long narrow room running the length of the building. A sliding timber door opens into the main hall. One end of the room is partitioned to form a commercial kitchen. The room is ceiled with sheeting.

The small rear gable-roofed extension houses a room and corridors that provide access to the stage. The room and corridors are ceiled with sheeting.

=== Memorial Gates ===
The memorial gates are located at the front (southern end) of the hall. The gates and associated fences form a semi-circle around the front of the main part of the hall. They comprise four sandstone pillars supporting wrought iron fences and a wrought iron gate. The two pillars supporting the gates are larger than the others. A flag pole is located at each end of the structure.

Each pillar comprises a cube-shaped base with a narrower square sectioned shaft topped by a pyramid. A projecting ornamental moulding surrounds the shaft near the top and the pyramid has a single step at about mid height.

Rectangular marble slabs containing the names of the enlisted and also the names of those rejected for service are mounted on the front of the pillars supporting the gates. The lettering is dark grey in appearance. The left pillar contains the words "Erected by the residents of Montville District in appreciation of those residents who enlisted in the Great War 1914-1919". Beneath this are the names of the six men who died. A list of thirty three names is inscribed on the right pillar under the heading "Enlisted". Beneath this is a list of a further six names under the heading "Rejected".

A small garden is cultivated inside the semi-circle formed by the gates. To the right of the gates in front of the eastern extension of the hall is another small garden edged by rocks. Four short pillars are arranged in a row along the front of this garden.

=== The "Village Green" and memorial trees ===
The "Village Green" is a triangular park formed by Memorial Close (north), Razorback Road (south) and Main Street (west). Memorial Close is between the park and the memorial gates. The six memorial trees are evenly spaced in a row along the northern edge of the park opposite the gates.

The memorial trees are tall spreading figs (Ficus benjamina) that overhang Memorial Close and much of the park. Other smaller trees and shrubs grow in the park (including three Ficus obliqua on the south- west side) and together with the memorial trees create an extensive green shady area. The park is covered with lawn except under the trees and where there are small garden plots along the Main Street edge. A low stone wall runs at intervals along this edge. There is a flagpole at the north western corner of the park.

Each of the memorial trees bears a small brass plaque inscribed with "1914-1918", the name of one of the dead from World War I, and "Lest We Forget". A series of four picnic settings are spaced at regular intervals in a row underneath the trees.

The picnic settings and a modern brick amenities block in the north-east corner of the park are not considered to be of cultural heritage significance.

=== Montville Memorial Hall, St Mary's Church Hall and Community Centre ===
The Montville Memorial Hall is located at the rear of the "Village Green". It is a small gable-roofed, weatherboard hall with the long axis, containing the front verandah and entrance, facing Main Street. There is a skillion roofed extension at the northern end.

A verandah with a corrugated iron roof and a small gable in the middle runs the length of the front (western) elevation except the extension. Entrance is gained through a double set of wooden doors. Double sets of casement windows open either side of this door. The verandah has short balustrades at each end, but none across the front.

Four plaques are fastened to the front wall, two on either side of the door. Left of the door, one plaque commemorates the arrival of the Salvation Army at Montville in 1897. The other commemorates the addition of the verandah in August 1995. To the right of the door, a plaque commemorates the construction of the hall during World War II and the donation of the hall to St Mary's Church in 1978. Another plaque, dated 2002, commemorates those who served and died during World War II and the "'Fuzzy Wuzzy Angels' who supported them in the Milne Bay and Kokoda campaigns, 1942".

Two sets of casement windows open into the southern elevation, which otherwise is devoid of notable features. Two sets of casement windows open into the opposite elevation. The window nearest to the front is a double set. There is a wooden door between these windows. A double wooden door approached by a long ramp provides access in the middle of the rear (eastern) elevation. Double sets of casement windows are located either side of this door. A corrugated iron tank on a tank- stand is located at the northern end.

The interior of the hall comprises two rooms: a large hall and small kitchen. The kitchen is housed in the skillion roofed northern extension. It is lined with painted vertical boards and fitted with built-in cupboards and a sink. A door and a wide servery open into the kitchen from the main hall. The hall is undecorated except for a picture of the Queen and an Australian flag that are hung at the southern end. A built-in cabinet is fitted to the northern wall next to the door into the kitchen. The walls, ceiling and floor of the hall are lined with unpainted light-coloured timber boards.

== Heritage listing ==
Montville Memorial Precinct was listed on the Queensland Heritage Register on 28 August 2008 having satisfied the following criteria.

The place is important in demonstrating the evolution or pattern of Queensland's history.

The Montville Memorial Precinct is important in demonstrating the pattern of Queensland's history, being associated with Australia's involvement in two world wars and with the national expressions of grief that followed. The World War I memorials at Montville (1921 gates and 1923 memorial trees) reflect a period of strong and widespread Australian patriotism and nationalism when most Queensland communities erected a public memorial to honour local participation in the war.

The place demonstrates rare, uncommon or endangered aspects of Queensland's cultural heritage.

The Montville Memorial Gates (1921) are rare in Queensland insofar as they include the names of men who volunteered for service in World War I but were rejected. Associations of rejected volunteers often petitioned for their names to be included on memorials. However, while they appear on a number of honour boards, it is rare for them to be included on monuments.

The Montville Precinct, containing memorial gates and trees, Memorial Close, a soldiers' memorial hall, and honour rolls, is uncommon for the variety of memorial types located in close proximity to each other.

The place is important in demonstrating the principal characteristics of a particular class of cultural places.

The area is important in demonstrating the principal characteristics of war memorials. Designed for commemorative ceremonies, it contains a prominent monument: the memorial gates, which display the names of the local enlisted and dead and forms the centre-piece of memorial services. Memorial Close forms an open space in front of the monument that accommodates the people who participate in these services. The memorial trees display the names of the dead as well as providing a leafy canopy over the whole area. Behind the gates, the Montville Hall, containing honour rolls, provides for activities after the services.

The place is important because of its aesthetic significance.

Visually dominated by the spreading memorial fig trees (Ficus benjamina), the Montville Memorial Precinct with its well composed stone memorial gates, rustic timber and iron buildings and green lawns displays strong picturesque qualities. In a busy commercial area frequented by tourists from all over Australia, it forms a leafy, peaceful enclave.
