= Kentron =

Kentron may refer to:

- Kentron (company), now Denel Dynamics, a South African armaments company
- Kentron District, Yerevan, Armenia
- Kentron TV, an Armenian private television broadcasting company

== See also ==
- Kentro (disambiguation), several villages in Greece
