= Schulz Canal =

Drainage canal in Queensland, Australia

Coordinates: 27°23′00.51″S 153°05′59.84″E

Schulz Canal is an artificial waterway in Nundah, Queensland that enters Moreton Bay. There are tributaries that enter the short canal, draining the suburbs of Hendra and Wooloowin in Brisbane's north east.

It was originally constructed in the early 20th century, and was named after William Schulz, an alderman on the Toombul shire council at the time.

Today the canal begins in Kedron at the end of the Kedron Brook. Beyond the Toombul Shopping Centre carpark the Kedron Brook Floodway acts a main water diversion for waters away from the Brisbane Airport terminals via Nudgee towards the Boondall Wetlands park.

== See also ==
- Breakfast Creek
