= Kedron Brook =

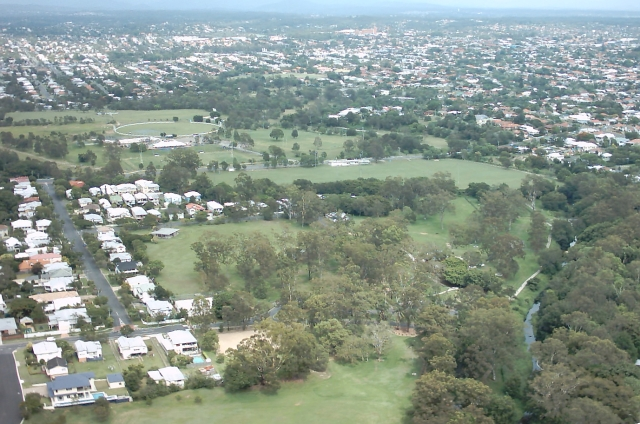
- Kedron Brook on the northern edge of Kalinga Park

- Location of the river mouth in Queensland

Location
- Country: Australia
- State: Queensland
- Region: South East Queensland
- Municipality: Brisbane

Physical characteristics
- Source: D'Aguilar Range
  - location: D'Aguilar National Park
- Source confluence: Kedron Creek and Cedar Creek
  - location: Ferny Grove
  - coordinates: 27°24′14″S 152°56′27″E
  - elevation: 220 m (720 ft)
- Mouth: confluence with the Schulz Canal
  - location: Nundah
  - coordinates: 27.410311°S 153.05897°E
  - elevation: 0 m (0 ft)
- Length: 29 km (18 mi)
- Basin size: 110 km^{2} (42 sq mi)

Basin features
- National park: D'Aguilar National Park (formerly the Brisbane Forest Park

The Kedron Brook is a creek that flows through the northern suburbs of Brisbane in the south-east region of Queensland, Australia.

== Course and features ==
Kedron Brook arises from the confluence of Kedron Creek and Cedar Creek in the Brisbane suburb of Upper Kedron, and then flows in an easterly direction. Kedron Brook then meanders through suburbs including Enoggera, Stafford, Grange, Lutwyche, Wooloowin, Kalinga Park, Toombul and Hendra before it empties into the Schulz Canal, which flows into Moreton Bay at Nudgee Beach. The river descends 220 metres (720 ft) over its 29-kilometre (18 mi) course and has a catchment area of 110 square kilometres (42 sq mi).

For much of its length, Kedron Brook is lined with parks and sporting facilities such as bikeways and football fields. Kedron Brook has been channelised where it passes suburbs such as Lutwyche and Wooloowin. Tidal influence reaches as far as Toombul.

== History ==
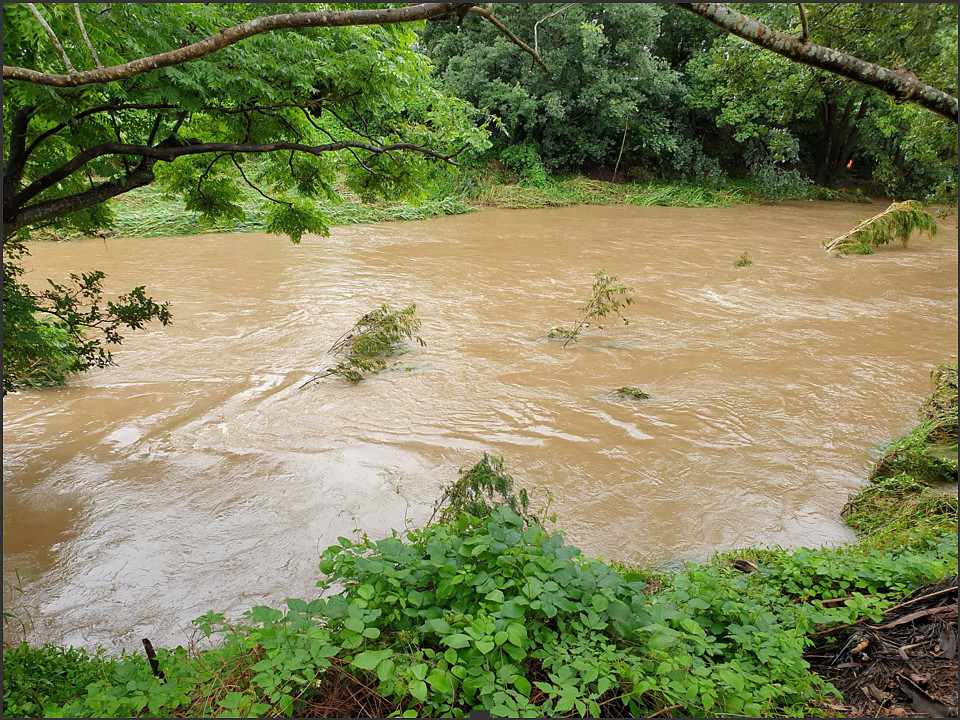
Kedron Brook in flood at Alderley, 2022

Kedron Brook was named by the German missionary group which established German Station (now Nundah) in March 1838. It is named after Kidron Valley near Jerusalem. In the 1880s, small amounts of coal were found along the banks of the creek.

The original course of Kedron Brook has been significantly altered in the vicinity of Brisbane Airport, where it has been redirected to a canal named the Schulz Canal. This was done to allow expansion of the airport in recent decades. The canal empties into Moreton Bay adjacent to the small bayside village of Nudgee Beach. At the lower end of the catchment, Boondall Wetlands is an internationally recognised habitat (Ramsar site) for migratory wader birds and other animals in Moreton Bay.

Kedron Brook flooded during the 2022 Brisbane floods. Flood damage eradicated a large section of a popular bike track. Repairs to the bikeway took months to complete and cost millions of dollars.

== Gallery ==
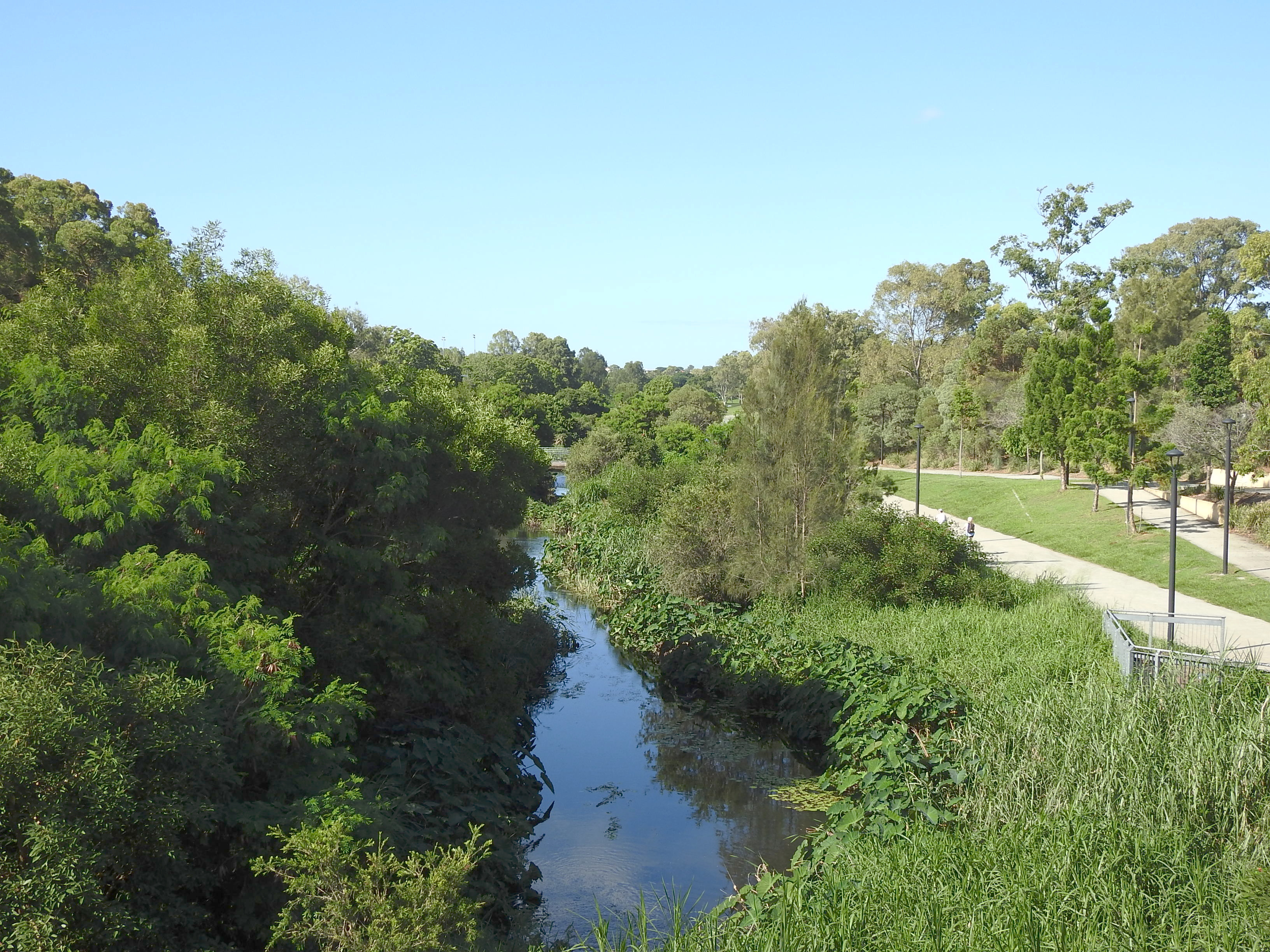
Kedron Brook stream, looking downstream from Gympie Road, Kedron (2021)

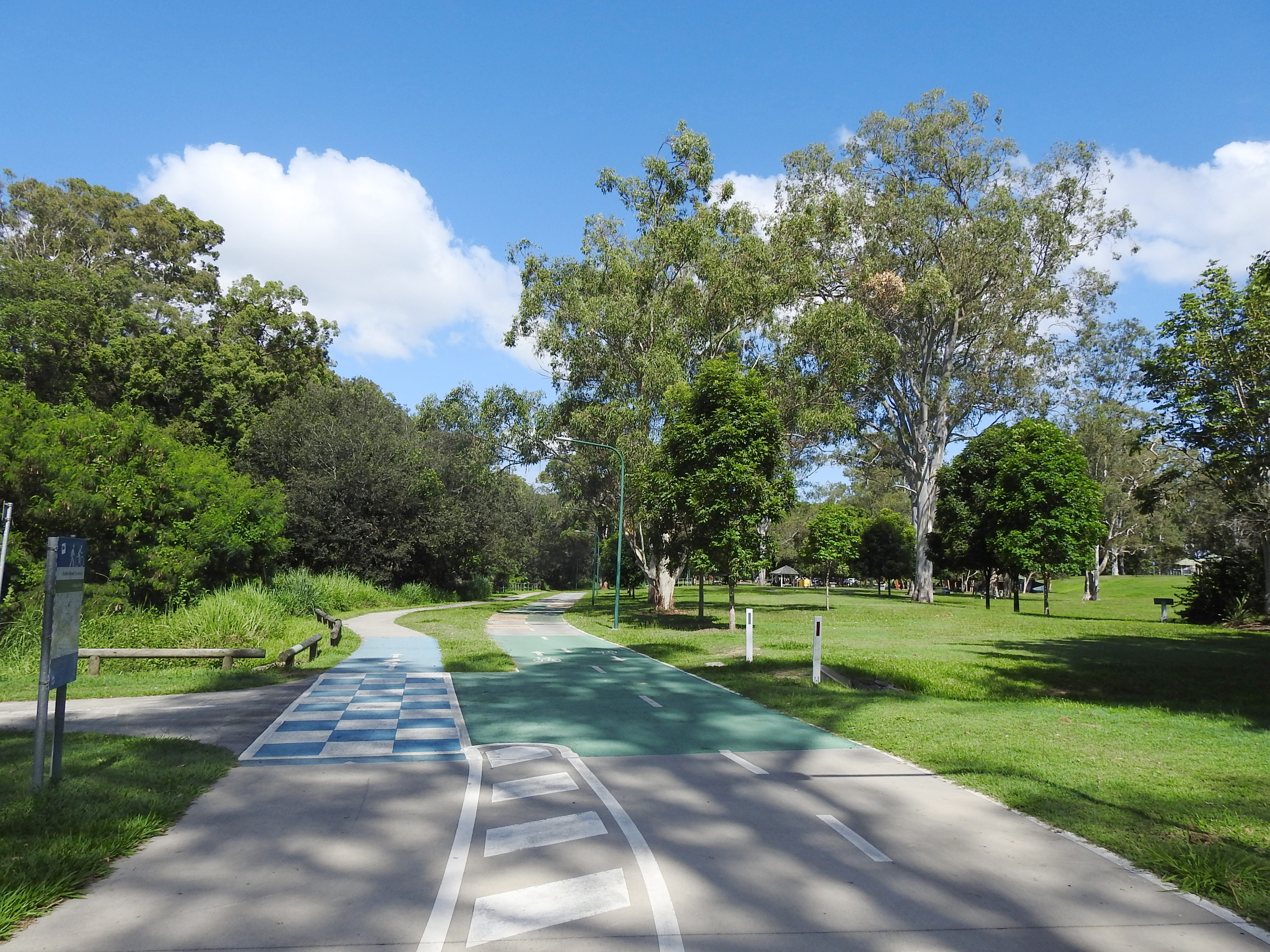
Bicycle and pedestrian paths, Kalinga Park, Kalinga (2021)

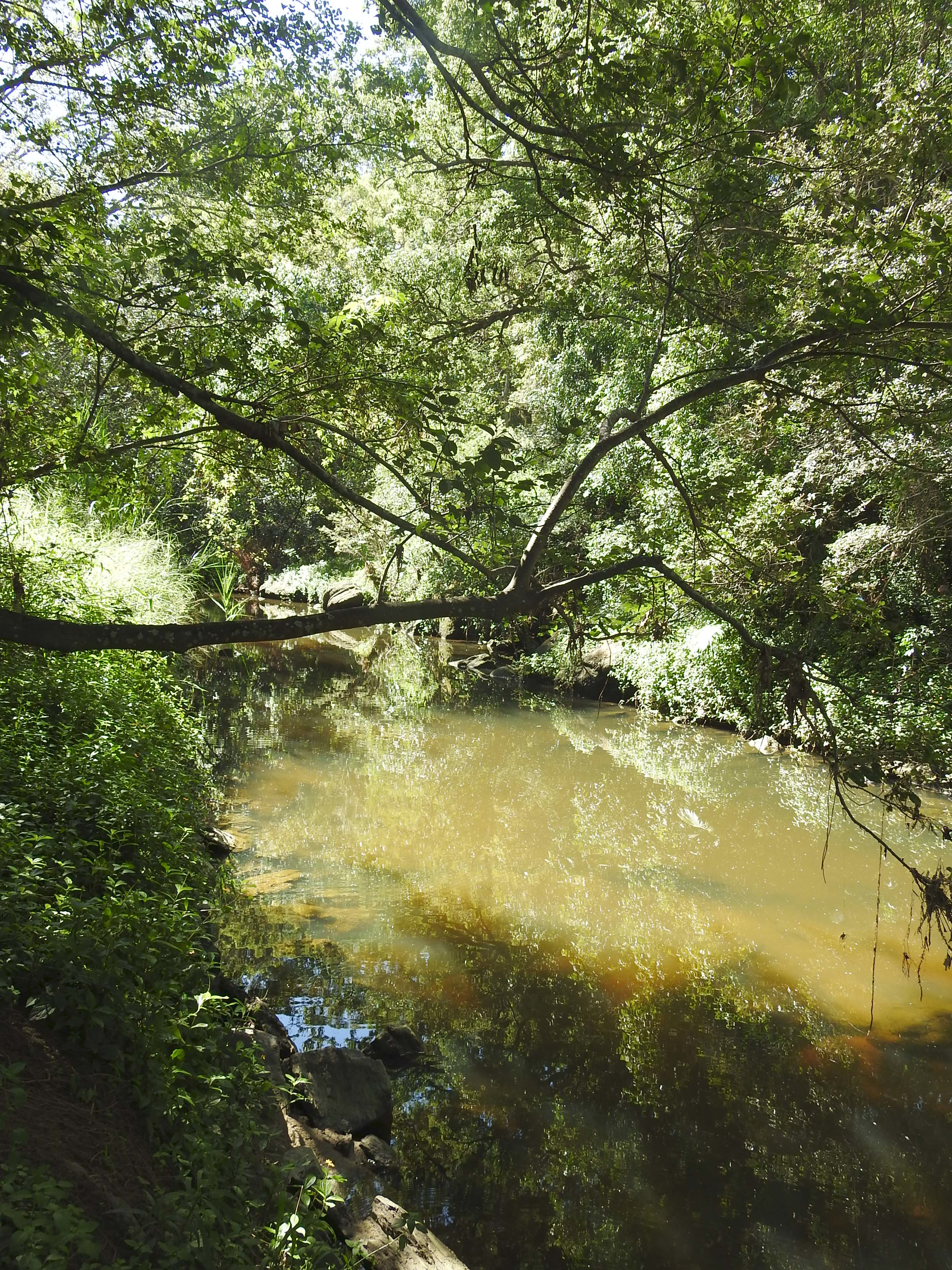
Kedron Brook looking upstream, Kalinga Park, Kalinga (2021)

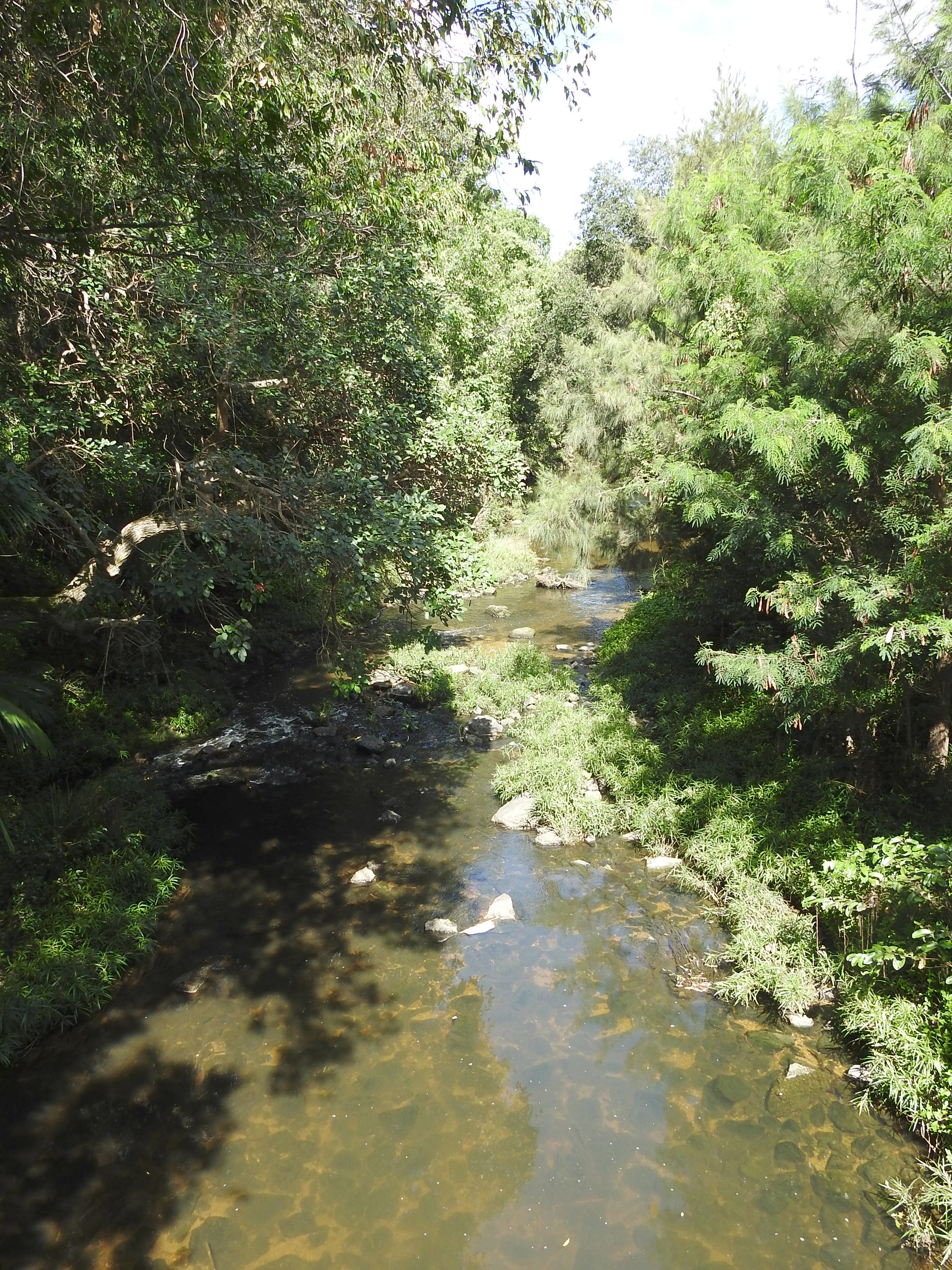
Kedron Brook looking downstream, Kalinga Park, Kalinga (2021)

== See also ==
- List of rivers of Australia § Queensland
