= Kentro =

Kentro (Greek: Κέντρο) may refer to several places in Greece:

- Kentro, Grevena, a village in the municipal unit Ventzio, Grevena regional unit
- Kentro, Elis, a village in the municipal unit Amaliada, Elis
- Kentro, Messenia, a village in the municipal unit Avia, Messenia

== See also ==
- Kentron (disambiguation)
