= Kedron Creek =

Stream in Minnesota, U.S.

Coordinates: 43°46′12″N 92°20′27″W

Kedron Creek is a stream in the U.S. state of Minnesota.

The stream was named after the Kidron Valley near Jerusalem.

== See also ==
- List of rivers of Minnesota
