= Brisbane Tramways substations =

A network of Brisbane tramways substations, supplied from the Brisbane Powerhouse, were developed by Brisbane City Council after they took over the Brisbane Tramways system from Brisbane Tramways Company (BTCo). The new powerhouse and substations were needed, as BTCo had not adequately invested enough into the electricity network to keep the system running efficiently. Brisbane City Council maintained this electricity network from 1927 until 1969, when the decision was made not to have Trams in Brisbane, and the network was shut down and decommissioned.

== Original Brisbane Tramways Company network ==
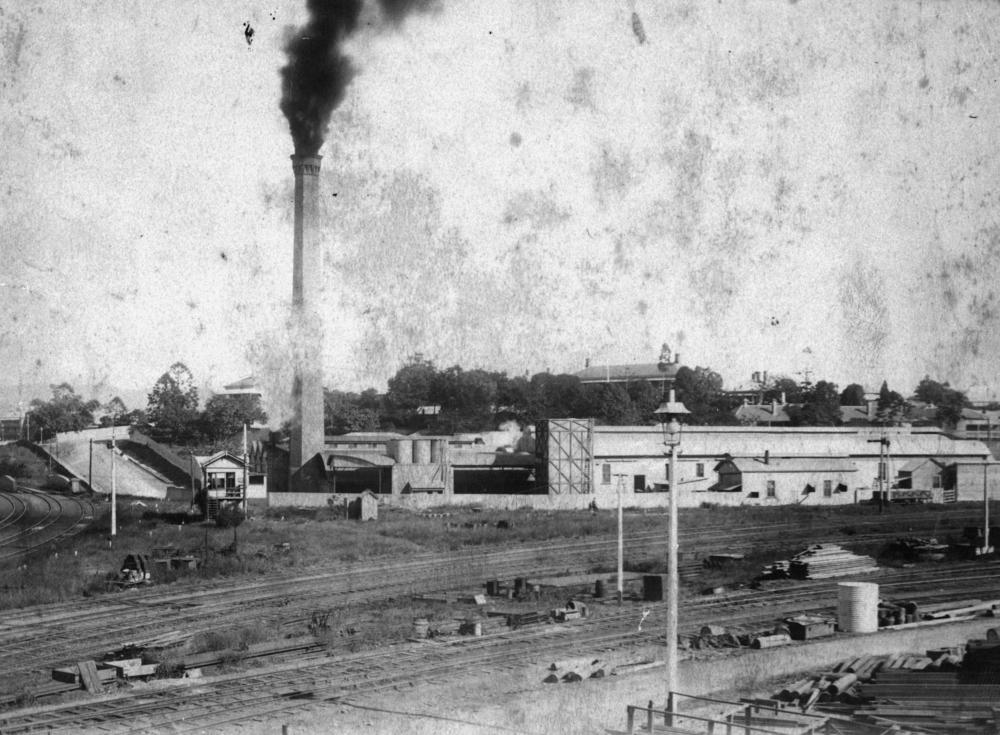
The tramway powerhouse and workshops complex in Countess Street, seen from the east, with rail lines into Roma Street station in the foreground

Workshops and administration for the electric tram system were initially located in cramped quarters at Countess Street, at the western side of the Roma Street railway yards (now the site of the Roma Street Parkland), but in 1927 were relocated to Milton. Access to the workshops was from Boomerang Street in Milton, off Milton Road. Head Office was accessed from Coronation Drive (then known as River Road).

Power for the electric trams was originally drawn from a power station operated by the tramway company adjacent to its Countess Street depot and workshops. As the tramway company increased both the number of trams and the length of routes, the power supply rapidly became inadequate. Additional power generating units were installed at Light Street, Fortitude Valley depot and a further powerhouse was built on Logan Road Woolloongabba, adjacent to the Woolloongabba railway line. Inadequate power supply was to remain a problem while the tramways remained in private hands. With the takeover of the system in 1922 by the Brisbane Tramways Trust (and subsequently the City Council) considerable investment was made in many areas including power generation and distribution. A larger powerhouse was built in New Farm which commenced generation in 1928 and was sufficient for both the needs of the tram system and other consumers.

The original Countess street powerhouse was demolished and material from it was used to construct the new Tramways headquarters.

== Brisbane Powerhouse ==
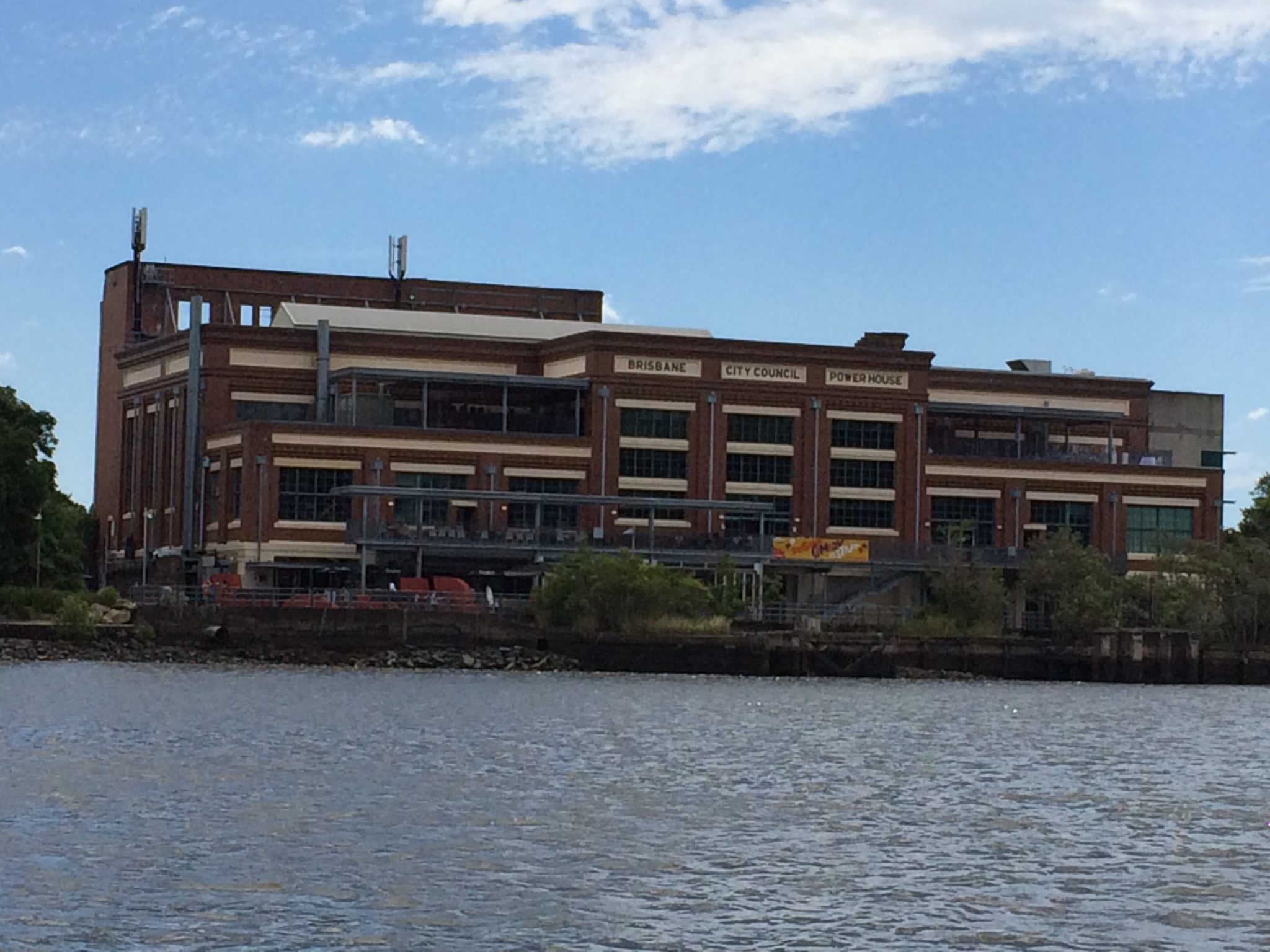
New Farm Powerhouse, as seen from the Brisbane River, 2015

The original Brisbane Powerhouse, located at New Farm was designed by Tramways Department Architect Roy Rusden Ogg and commissioned by the newly formed Greater Brisbane City Council, went into service as the first council-operated power station built in Brisbane in June 1928.

== Tramways substations ==
The substations were located at strategic points throughout the system. Prior to 1940, their design was the responsibility of BCC Tramways Department architect and construction engineer, Roy Rusden Ogg. In conjunction with the tramway's chief engineers Nelson and Arundell, he designed 10 Brisbane substations between 1926 and 1936 and the first two stages of the New Farm powerhouse.

=== Tramways substations (1927-1940) by Roy Ogg ===
Ogg designed 8 classic stand alone brick substations, seven of which survive today, all of which are heritage listed. In addition Ogg also designed the Ballow St Control building, which contained Tramway Substation No. 1. Tramway Substation No. 3 was not a brick building, being just a tin shed. Dates in the table below are sourced from Brisbane City Council Archives

Name	Original No	Address	Commissioning Date	Existence	Heritage	Details
Ballow St	1	Ballow St, Fortitude Valley	Operational in June 1928.	Still existing.	No heritage listing	This Electrical Control Room and Substation building is located on a block of land between Ballow and Constance Streets in Fortitude Valley. Upon the tramways demise in 1969 it was turned into an Electricity Department Depot, which was absorbed by SEQEB (Later Energex) in 1977. The site was sold by Energex in 1998. Unusually, the substation was not finished with reddish-brown bricks (burnt sienna colour), instead it had a rendered finish, although the building has undergone many additions and changes, and is no longer visually prominent from either Ballow Street or Constance Street.
Russell St	2	1 Russell St, South Brisbane	Operational in February 1927.	No longer in existence.	N/A	In 1985 the substation site was incorporated into the overall site for Expo 88, when the parkland was extended with almost all properties between Stanley Street, Vulture Street, the railway and Russell Street were demolished and roads also cleared for the site of Expo 88. Photos of the demolition exist. The Russell Street Tramways Substation along with the old City Electric Light Company (later Southern Electric Authority of Queensland or SEAQ) Stanley Street Substation next to Ship Inn were both demolished to make way for Expo 88. Currently the site is used by the ABC Brisbane Studios. The substation was constructed of reddish-brown bricks (burnt sienna colour).
Logan Road	3	Logan Road, Wooloongabba (opposite Nile St)	Operational in June 1928.	No longer in-situ.	N/A	This building was relocated to Murgen. A tin shed, Tramways Substation No. 3 was not like the other substations, and may have had minimal involvement from Ogg. This substation was located on the site of the old Brisbane Tramways Company Powerhouse, which was originally built in 1915, then mostly demolished in 1928. The remaining section of the building, located on the Logan Road frontage of the site was re-used for the tramways substation. The Jurgens St frontage of the old powerhouse site was used by the much smaller BCC Electricity Substation No 9. The tramlines then in existence effectively separated the two sites from one another. In 1969, following the demise of the tramways system, Brisbane City Council had absolutely no need for the tramways substation to be used by the broader electricity network, with two other electricity substations in close proximity: City Electric Light Substation No 5 and Brisbane City Council Substation No 9. As a result, Council re-organised the site, with the electricity substation No.9 subdivided off to allow the much larger tramways substation portion to be sold in 1972. Only a few years later however, with the BCC Electricity Department was to be merged into SEQEB in 1976, and Substation No.9 was decommissioned and demolished, leaving the iconic City Electric Light Substation No. 5 in the roundabout as the only remnant of the areas strong electricity heritage.
Petrie Terrace	4	24 Petrie Terrace, Petrie Terrace	Operational in August 1928.	Existing	Local Heritage Listed (Place ID 322)	Notable as one of two substations that still retain the Brisbane Tramways Logo and number still. The substation is constructed of reddish-brown bricks (burnt sienna colour).
Newstead	5	199 Breakfast Creek Road, Newstead	Operational in July 1928.	Existing	State Heritage Listed (Place ID 600265)	Listed as part of Newstead House and Park. Since the closure of the tram system in 1969 the substation was purchased by the Newstead House Board of Trustees and has been used as a Resource Centre and offices for management staff. Notable as one of two substation that still retain the Brisbane Tramways Logo and number still. The substation is constructed of reddish-brown bricks (burnt sienna colour).
Windsor (Old)	6	356 Lutwyche Road, Windsor (Windsor Town Quarry Park)	Operational in February 1927.	Existing	State Heritage Listed (Place ID 602492)	Unlike the other substations which were decommissioned in 1969, Windsor was replaced in June 1949, due to its small size (it is around 7m by 9m). Brisbane City Council never sold the site, and it is used for storage and maintenance purposes for maintaining Windsor Town Quarry Park. The substation is constructed of reddish-brown bricks (burnt sienna colour).
Paddington	7	150 Ennoggera Terrace, Paddington	Operational in August 1930.	Existing	State Heritage Listed (Place ID 601198)	The substation commenced operation on 11 August 1930 and remained in service until the phasing out of Brisbane's trams in the late 1960s. In 1969 the Paddington line was closed, the substation's electrical equipment was removed, and the building became a storage depot. In 1985, Hands On Art was given a fifteen-year lease of the building. In 2014, Hands On Art was still operating from the building and was running monthly "vintage and artisan" markets. Unusually, the substation is not finished with reddish-brown bricks (burnt sienna colour), instead it has a rendered finish.
Kedron	8	134 Kedron Park Road, Wooloowin	Operational in August 1935.	Existing	State Heritage Listed (Place ID 602411)	The building became a State Emergency Services Depot and changes were made to the interior to accommodate this use. The lower level of the original two level floor has been extended to park a rescue boat and a mezzanine level was inserted in the mid-1980s. A single storey brick garage has been added. The substation is constructed of reddish-brown bricks (burnt sienna colour).
Norman Park	9	97 Wynnum Road, Norman Park	Operational in November 1935.	Existing	State Heritage Listed (Place ID 602410)	Since 2007, the substation has been leased by Metro Arts as artists studios. The substation is constructed of reddish-brown bricks (burnt sienna colour).
Annerley	10	413 Ipswich Road, Annerley	Operational in August 1936.	Existing	Local Heritage Listed (Place ID 59)	Substation is now part of the Junction Hotel site, with the substation in use as a restaurant. The substation is constructed of reddish-brown bricks (burnt sienna colour). The Substation was originally much smaller and just fronted Ipswich Road (see aerial view of Annerley down below), with a later extension to the Annerley Road frontage, doubling the size of the substation building. The view of the Ipswich Road frontage is obscured by the property fence.

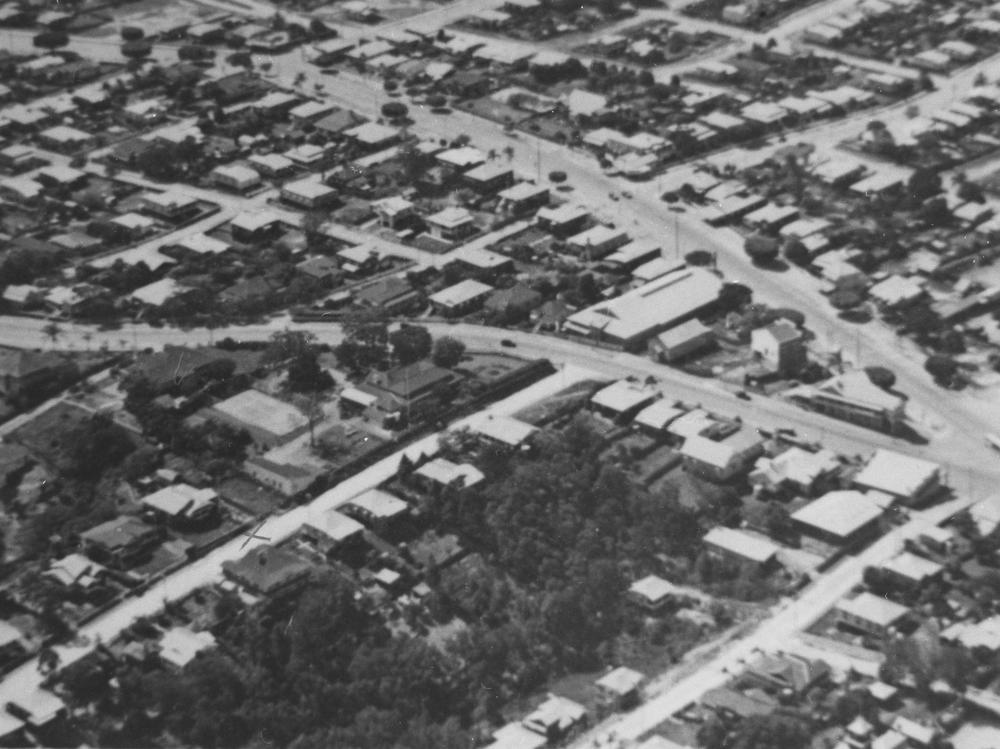
Aerial view of Annerley in the mid-1930s, shortly after Tramways Substation No.10 was constructed

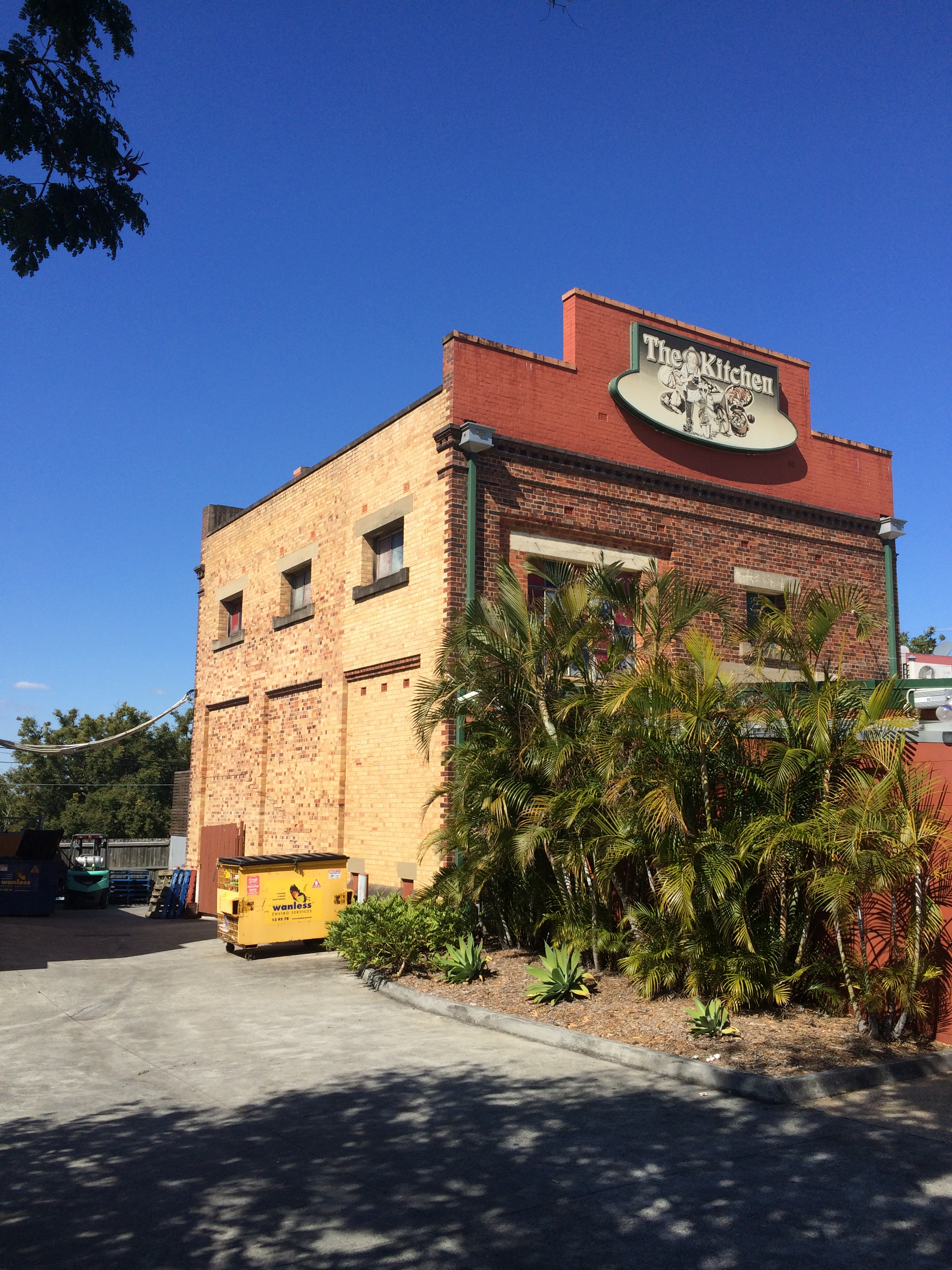
View of Tramways Substation No.10 from Annerley Road.

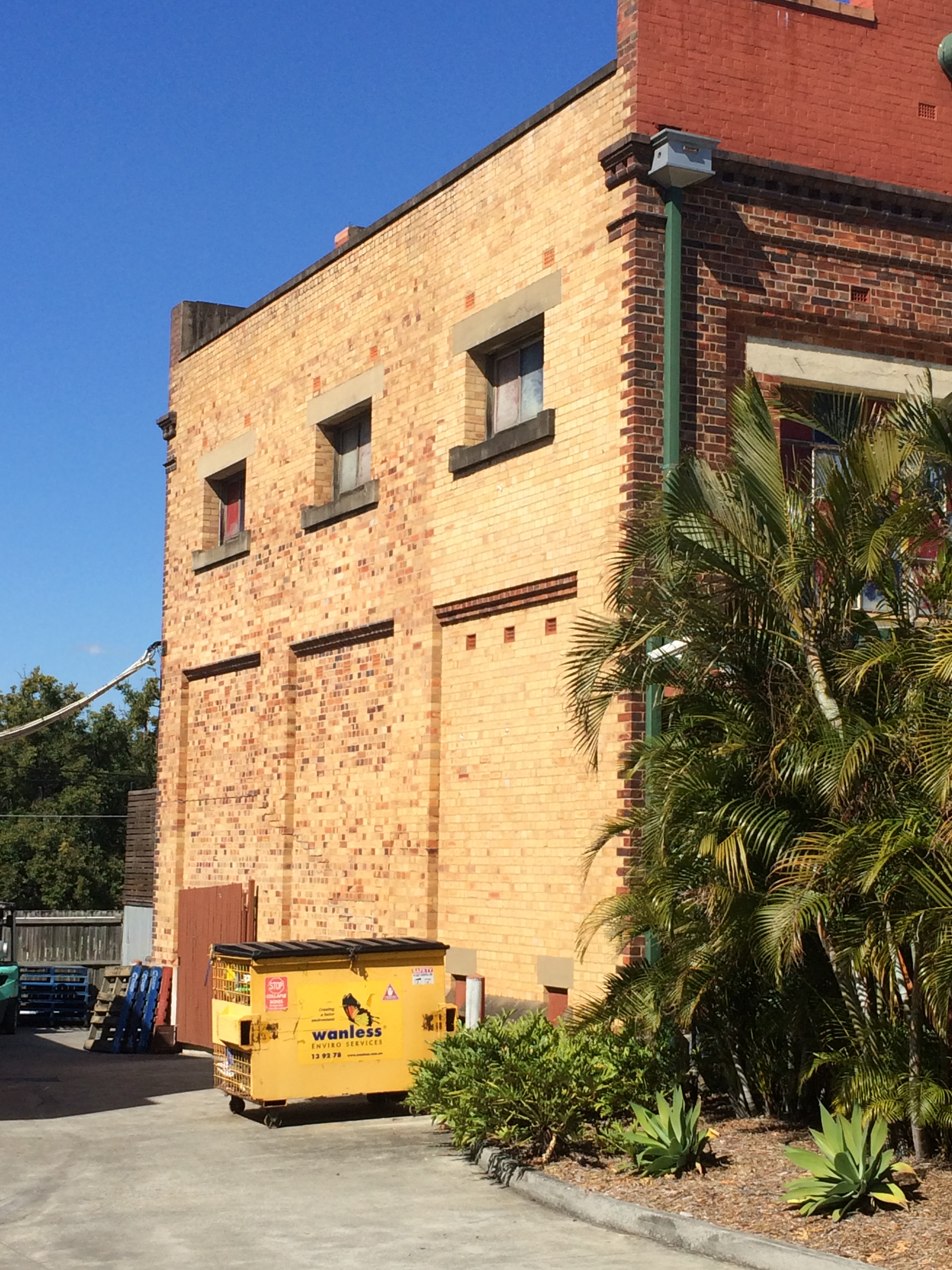
Close up view of Tramways Substation No. 10. Looking at the side of the building, the modern extension can be seen, with one third of the building modern yellow brick rather than the original reddish-brown "Burnt Sienna" brick.

=== Tramways substations (1948-1953) by Frank Costello ===
On 24 February 1941, a 38-year-old Sydney-based architect Frank Gibson Costello was appointed as the new City Architect. Costello had a completely different style of substation building, creating a much more utilitarian building, very different to his predecessors. Costello, later became the overall Town Planning and Building Department Manager, when the Town Planner, R.A. McInnes left Council. With the end of the Chandler administration in 1952, Costello himself was fired along with seven other executive officers (including his deputy), C.A. Hamilton on 7 July 1952.

While previously Roy Ogg had been the dedicated Tramways Architect, and the City Architects A.H.Foster and H.A.Erwood had no involvement in the Tramways at all, Costello as City Architect was responsible for all Council buildings. For this reason, Costello designed two of his six substations as joint tramways and electricity department substations. These two sites at Hamilton and Ashgrove saw the cooperation of three departments, with the Parks Department involved with public toilets also attached at these sites (these toilets are no longer publicly accessible). So while none of Oggs' substations are operational, two of Costello's are due to cooperation with the BCC Electricity Department.

Name	Original No	Address	Commissioning Date	Existence	Heritage	Details
Coorparoo	11	Old Cleveland Road, Coorparoo	Operational in May 1942.	Existing	No heritage listing	Substation is now re-purposed for commercial and retail purposes, and has been painted white and is not immediately recognisable as a tramway substation.
Hamilton	12	Hamilton	Operational in November 1948.	Existing	Local Heritage Listed	Part of operational Energex Substation. Costello designed Hamilton Substation as a joint tramways substation and normal electricity substation. From 1969, with the closure of the tram network, the tramways substation has been re-used by the Brisbane City Council electricity department and subsequently SEQEB and Energex as an electricity substation.
Windsor	13	336 Lutwyche Road, Windsor (Windsor Town Quarry Park)	Operational in June 1949.	Existing	Local Heritage Listed	Owned by Energex as a storage depot.
Ashgrove	14	244 Waterworks Road, Ashgrove (opposite Stewart Road)	Operational in April 1952.	Existing	No heritage listing	Part of operational Energex Substation. Costello designed Hamilton Substation as a joint tramways substation and normal electricity substation. From 1969, with the closure of the tram network, the tramways substation has been re-used by the Brisbane City Council electricity department and subsequently SEQEB and Energex as an electricity substation.
Alderley	15	Enoggera Road, Alderley	Operational in January 1952.	Existing	Local Heritage Listed	Re-purposed by private owner and used as a luxury residential home.
Holland Park	16	Holland Park	Operational in August 1953.	Existing	No heritage listing	Re-purposed by private owner and used as a commercial office.

=== Tramways substation design ===
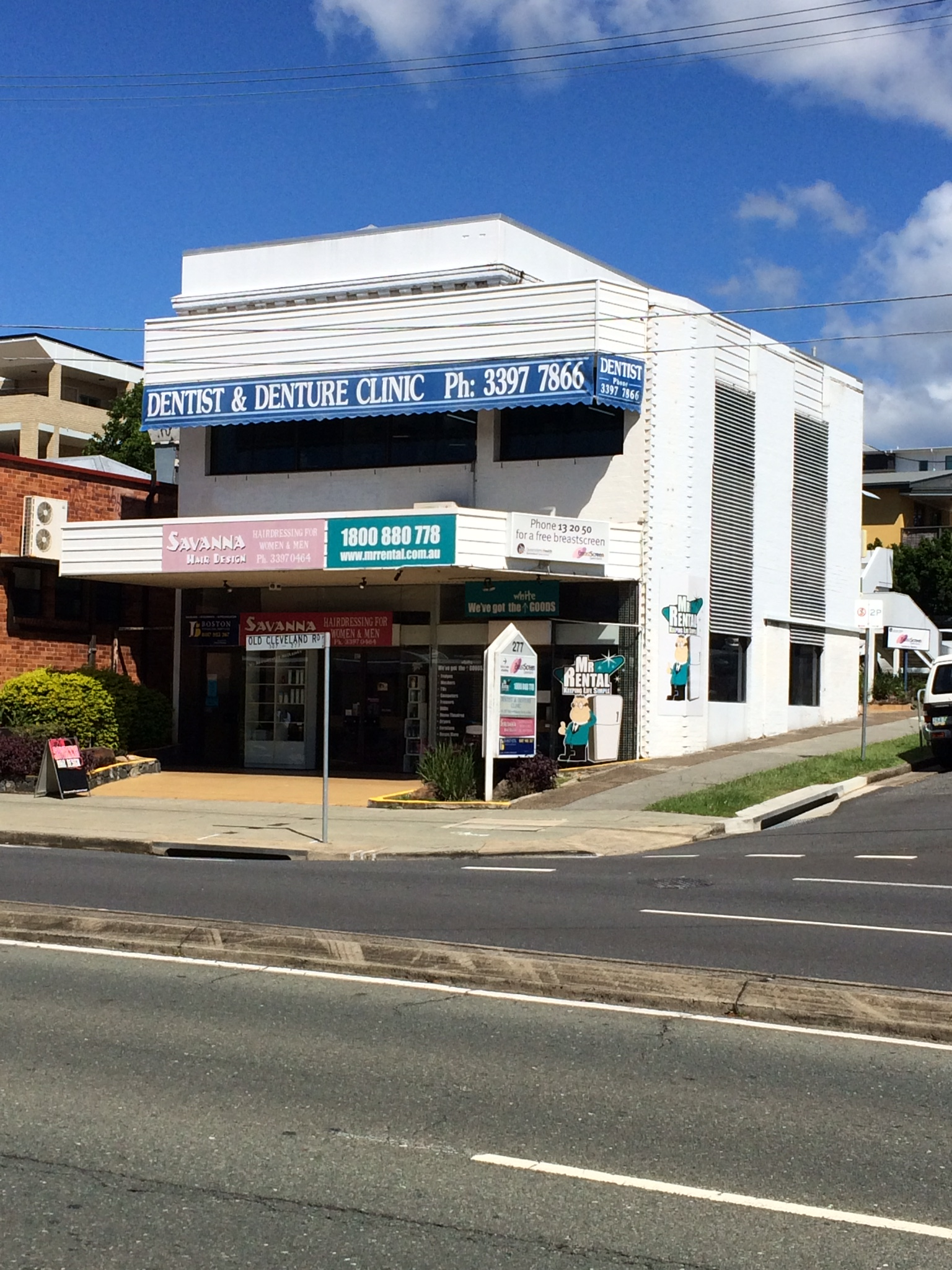
The Brisbane Tramways Substation No. 11 Coorparoo. Former tramways substation, now re-purposed as a retail shop.

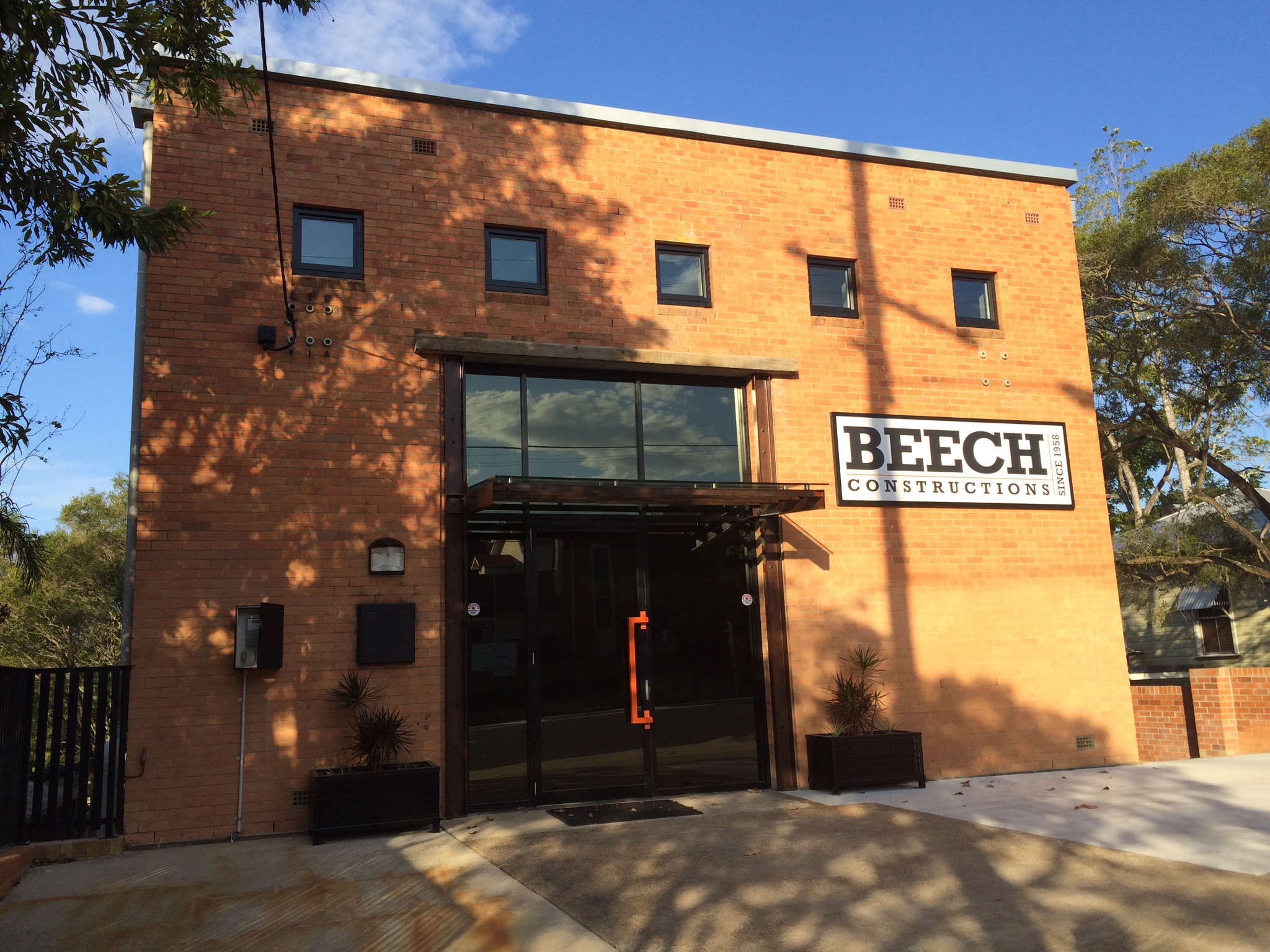
The Brisbane Tramways Substation No. 16 Holland Park - former substation, now re-purposed as a commercial property.

Considerable attention was given to the design of the substations serving the tramway system. The architecture was marked by the stylistic preferences of the individual architects, the Brisbane City Tramways architect Roy Rusden Ogg and later City Architect Frank Gibson Costello. Although they were robust utility buildings, generally small in scale, elegant proportions and such details as finely crafted brickwork distinguished them.

It is the fine design of the tramway substations which has seen most of them heritage listed. The listing for Brisbane Tramways Substation No.8 (Kedron) meets Criterion E of the Queensland Heritage Act 1992 - that "The place is important because of its aesthetic significance." The listing states that "The former substation contributes to the streetscape, its quality of design and materials enabling the prominently placed building to successfully combine function and a pleasing appearance."

The later substations, designed by Frank Costello have been successfully re-purposed for other uses, with Hamilton and Ashgrove Substations still used by Energex. Coorparoo, Holland Park and Alderley Tramways Substations were built close to other electricity department substations, and so eventually after the demise of the tramways network in 1969, they became redundant with no need for them for general electricity distribution and were eventually sold into private ownership.

The Alderley Tramways Substation has been re-purposed into a residential dwelling.

Holland Park and Alderley Substations are of very similar design with the main frontage having small high set windows above the main entrance, with the side elevations also having small high set windows, with much larger windows down below.

== Tramways Substation No.2 (Russell Street) ==
Tramway Substation No.2 is notable for being the only substation that has been demolished. It was demolished along with the old City Electric Light Company Stanley Street Substation (which was located next to the Ship Inn). Following the demise of the tramway network in 1969, the substation was taken over by the Brisbane City Council electricity department who made use of the substation for local electricity supply to the area. In 1985 the substation site was incorporated into the overall site for Expo 88, when the parkland was extended with almost all properties between Stanley Street, Vulture Street, the railway and Russell Street were demolished and roads also cleared for the site of Expo 88. The site would now be part of South Bank, Queensland.

Photos of the demolition exist, with the substation logo and no still visible. Despite the generally poor utilisation of the old tramway substation sites, they have otherwise survived, and have mostly been heritage listed. Modern heritage protection did not exist in Queensland until 1992, with some limited heritage protection first introduced in the Brisbane City Council 1987 Town Plan

Brisbane City Council has a good collection of photos showing what much of the South Bank site looked like prior to Expo 88. Essentially this previously industrial area had become run down and neglected. The Russell Street Tramways Substation is only shown in one photo.

== See also ==
- Trams in Brisbane
- Brisbane Powerhouse
- Brisbane Tramways Substation No. 5 at Newstead House
- Brisbane Tramways Substation No. 6
- Paddington Tramways Substation No. 7 at Paddington
- Brisbane City Council Tramways Substation No. 8 at Wooloowin
- Brisbane City Council Tramway Substation No 9 at Norman Park
