= Brisbane tuff =

Type of rock formed as a result of a volcanic eruption

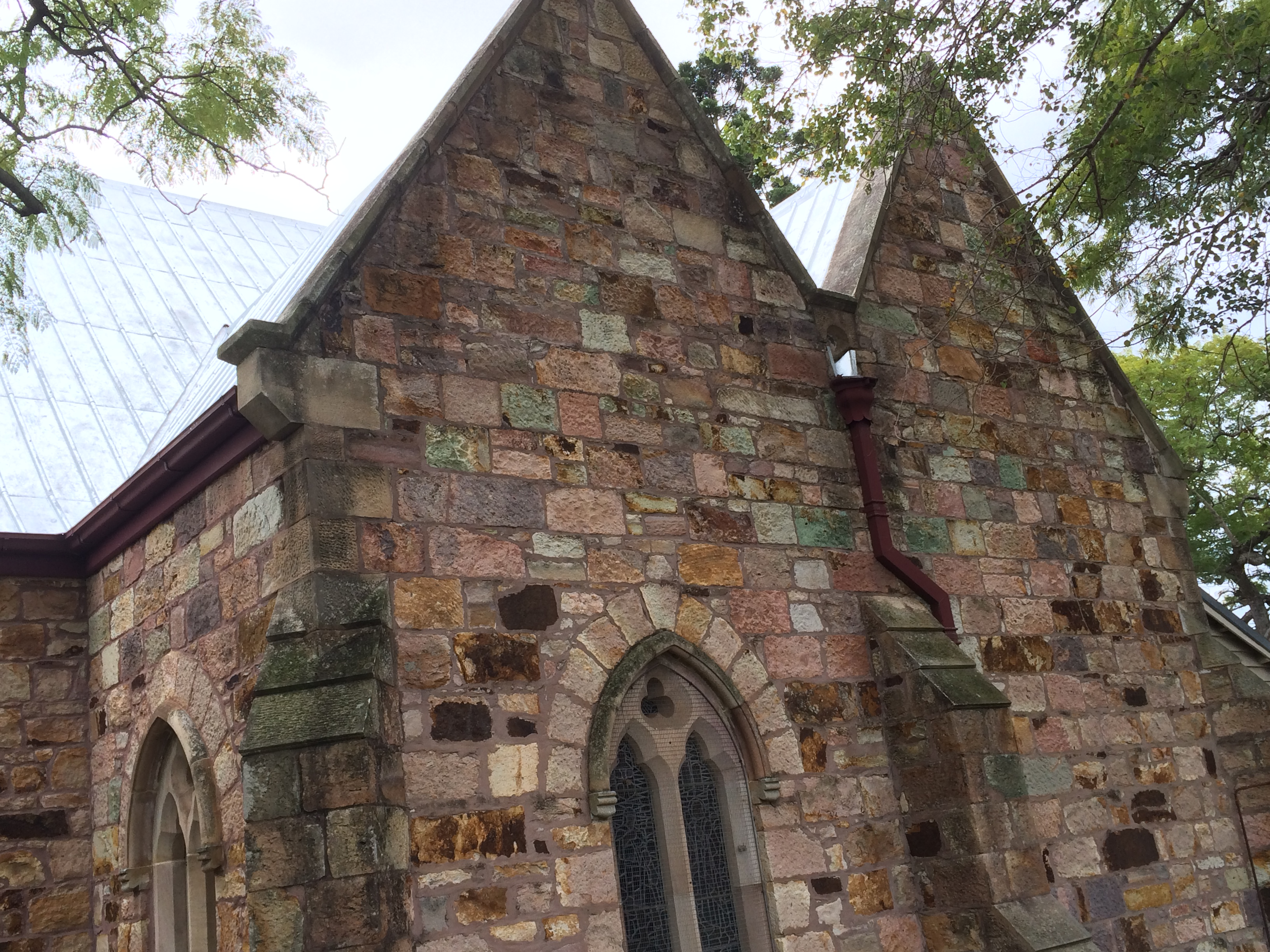
Illustrating the many natural colours of Brisbane tuff, St Mary's Anglican Church, Kangaroo Point, 2016

Brisbane tuff is a type of rock, formed as a result of a volcanic eruption. As the name suggests, it is a type of tuff found in Brisbane, Queensland, Australia. It is a form of welded ignimbrite. Brisbane tuff comes in a variety of colours: pink, green, blue-grey, yellow and purple. The different colours are due to the extent of oxidation of iron and manganese.

It is often incorrectly described as porphyry.

== History ==
Brisbane tuff began to be used during the period when Captain Patrick Logan was the commandant of the Moreton Bay penal colony.

Brisbane tuff is found in various parts of Brisbane and was quarried extensively in the early history of Brisbane at the Kangaroo Point Cliffs and the (now) Windsor Town Quarry Park for use in construction of Brisbane's earliest buildings.

== Geology ==
Brisbane tuff was formed by the welding and compaction of volcanic ash more than 226 million years ago. It displays pyroclastic flows of rock fragments deposited as the volcanic ash was forming. Layers of Brisbane tuff can be over 50 metres (160 ft) thick.

It is a form of welded ignimbrite. Brisbane tuff comes in a variety of colours: pink, green, blue (grey) and purple. The different colours are due to the extent of oxidation of iron and manganese.

== Construction ==
Brisbane tuff has been used in the construction of the following Brisbane buildings, many of them now heritage-listed:

- Commissariat Store, William Street
- Cathedral of St Stephen, Elizabeth Street
- Old Bishopsbourne Chapel (also known as Chapel of the Holy Spirit), Milton Road
- St Martin's House, Ann Street
- St Mary's Anglican Church, Kangaroo Point
- Manor Apartment Hotel, Queen Street (former Colonial Mutual Life building) using Benedict stone
- Shell House, Ann Street
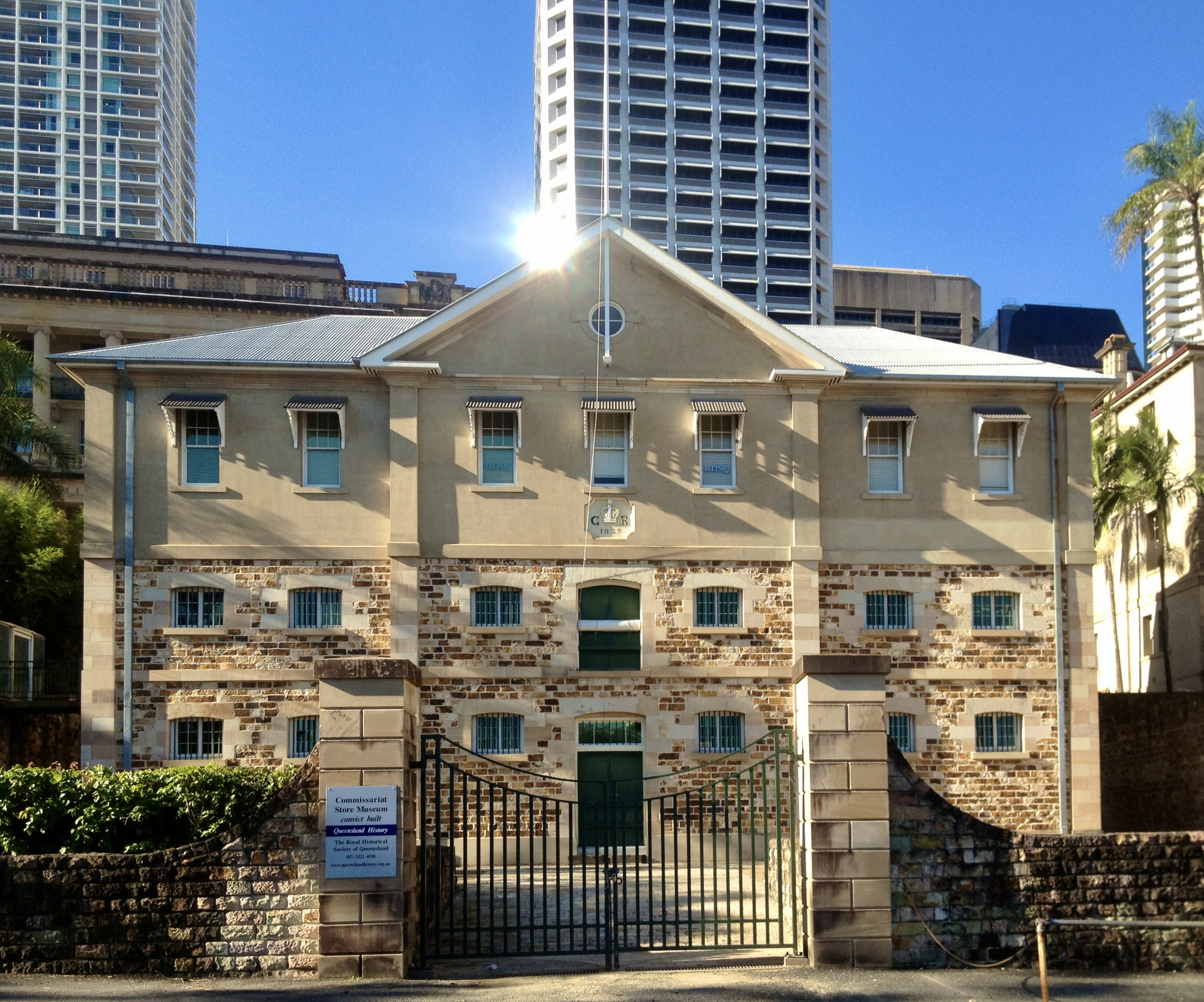
Commissariat Store

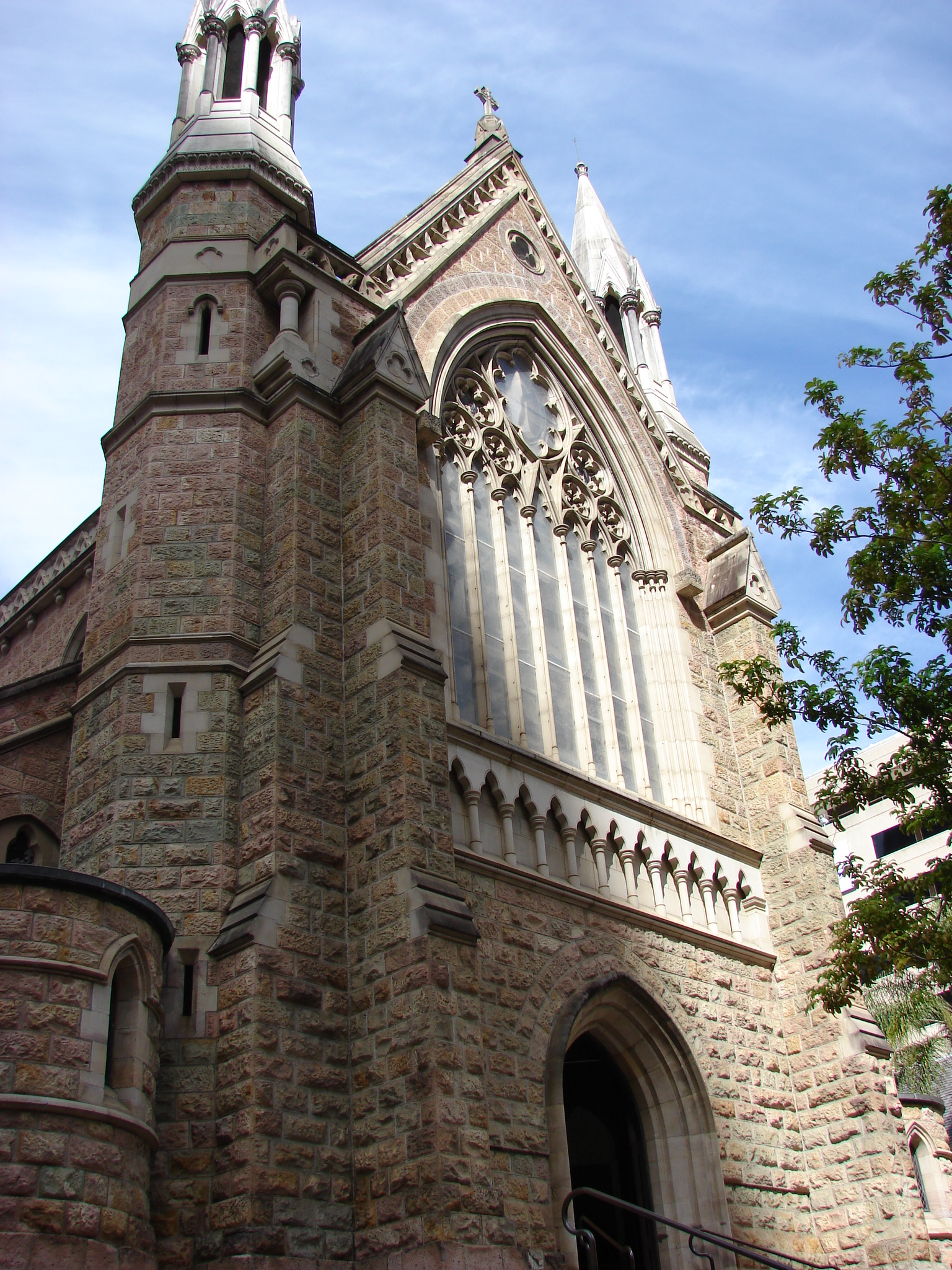
St Stephen's Cathedral

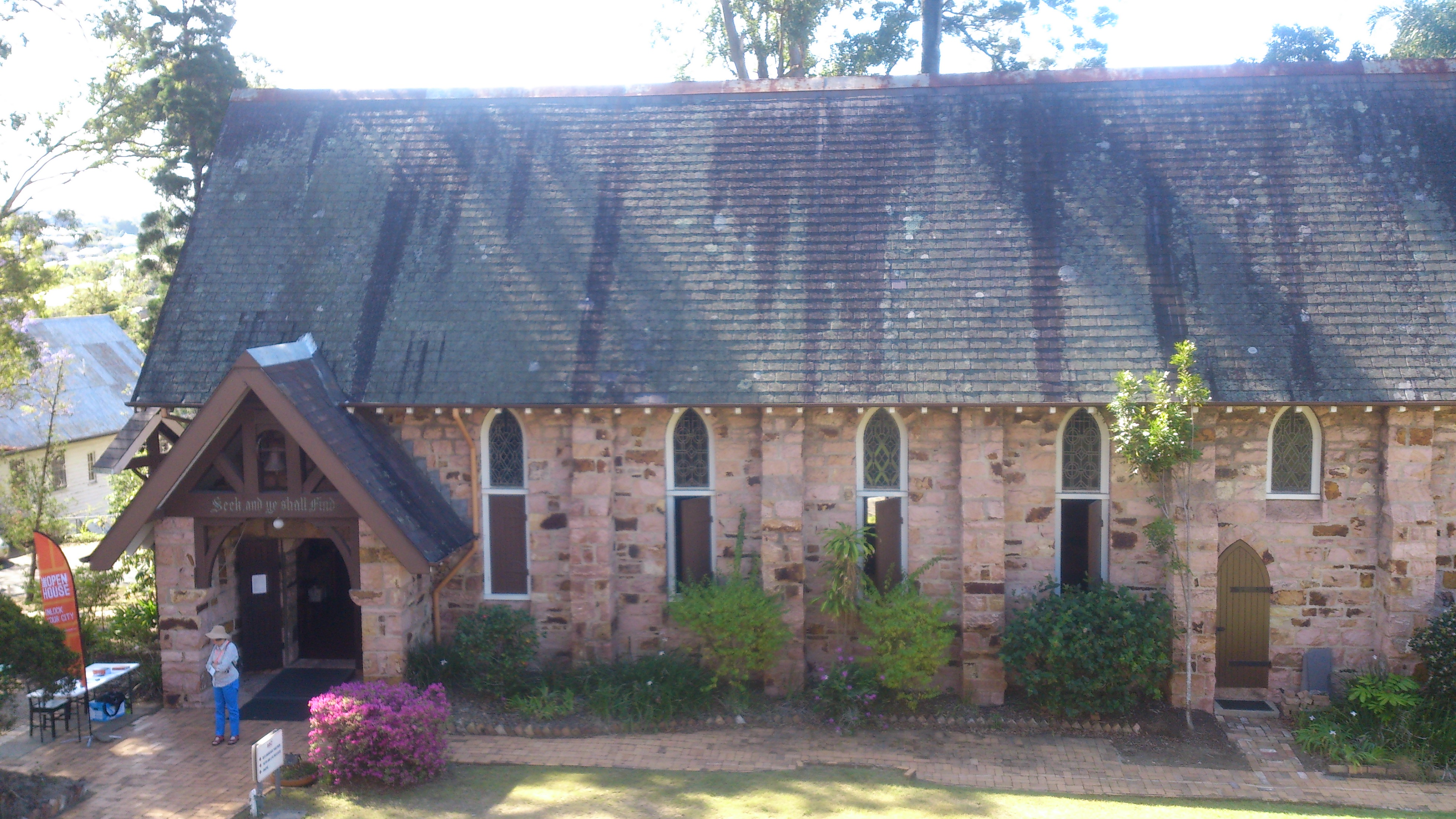
Old Bishopsbourne Chapel

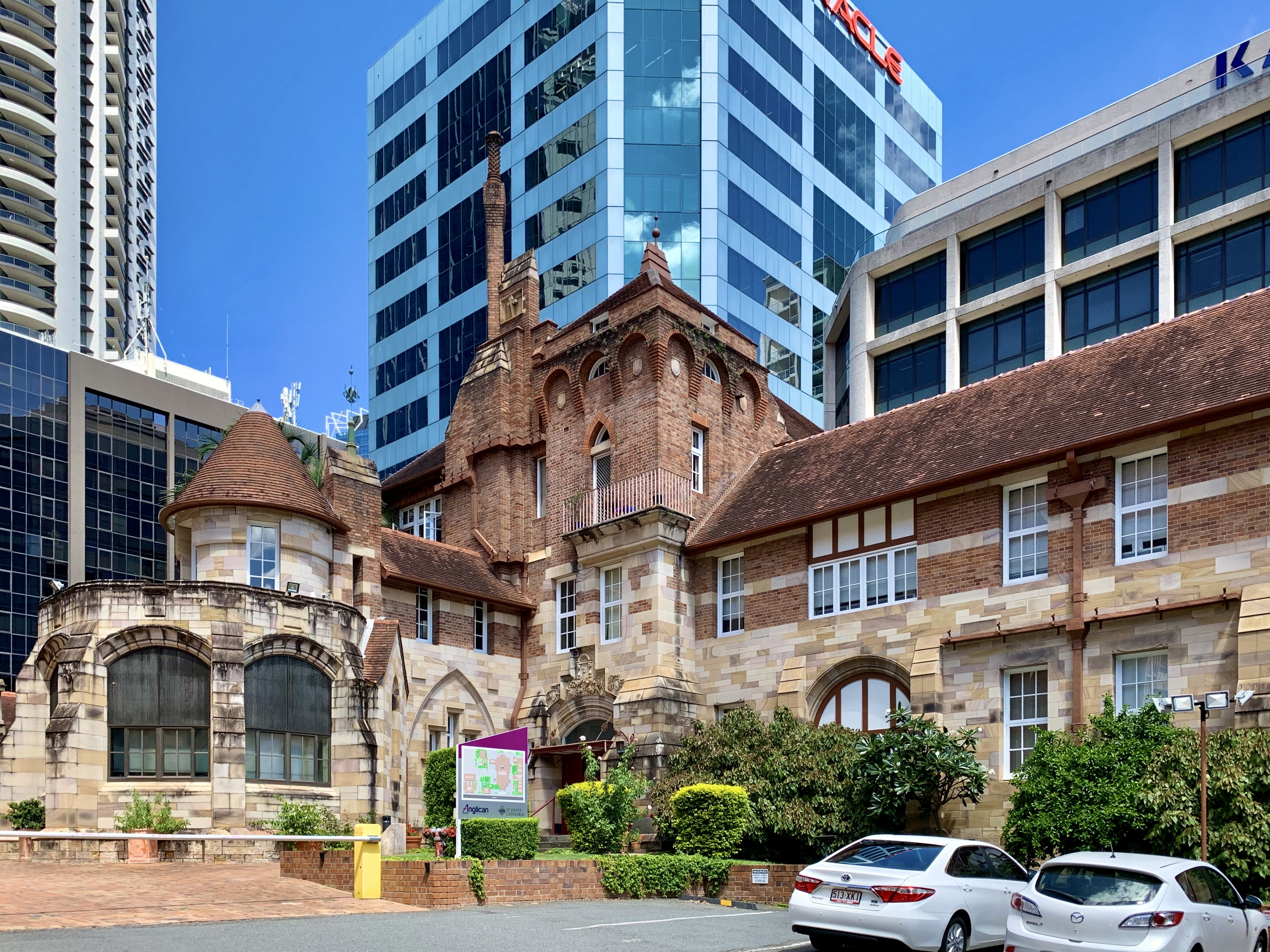
St Martin's House

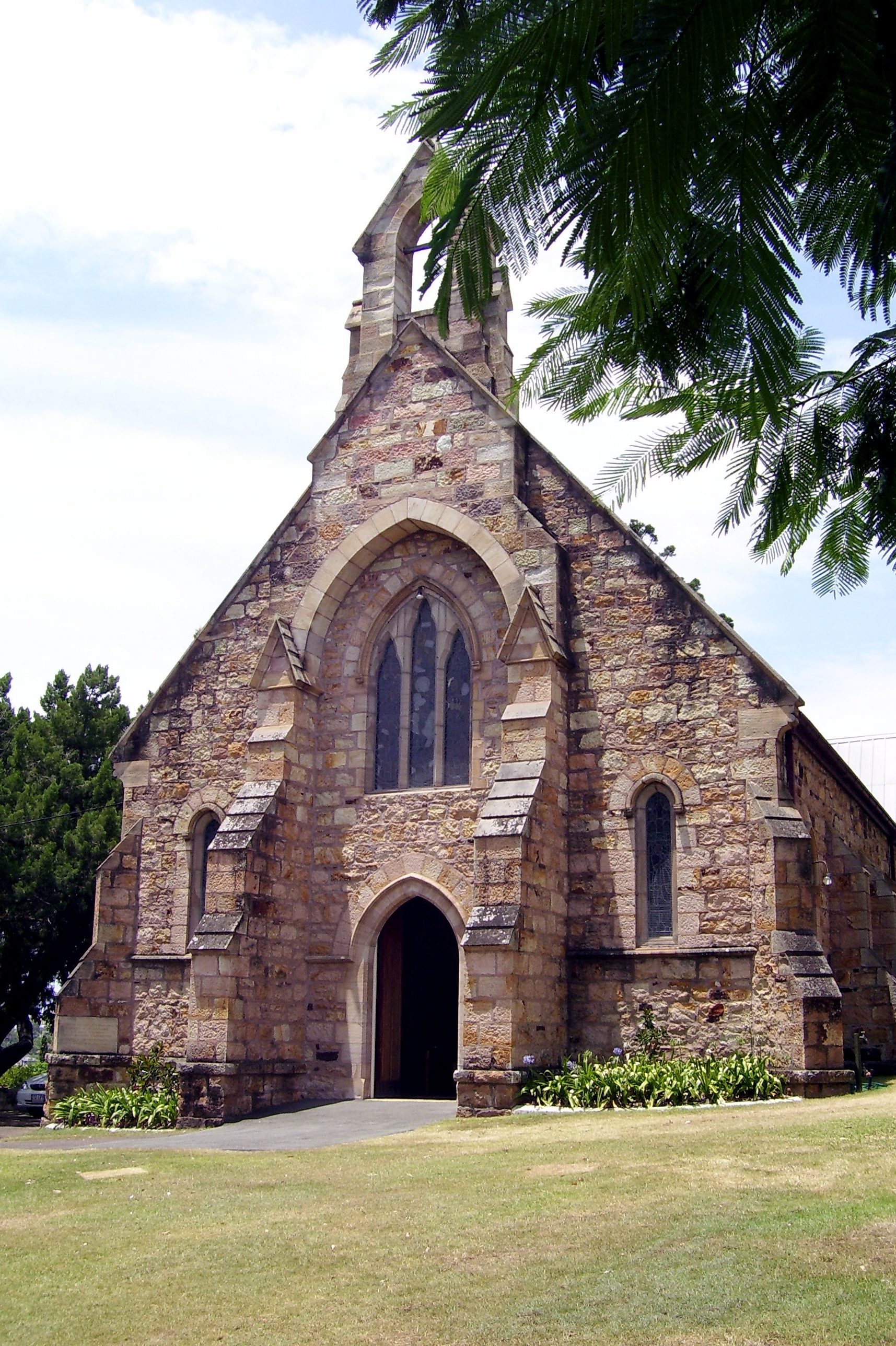
St Mary's Anglican Church, Kangaroo Point

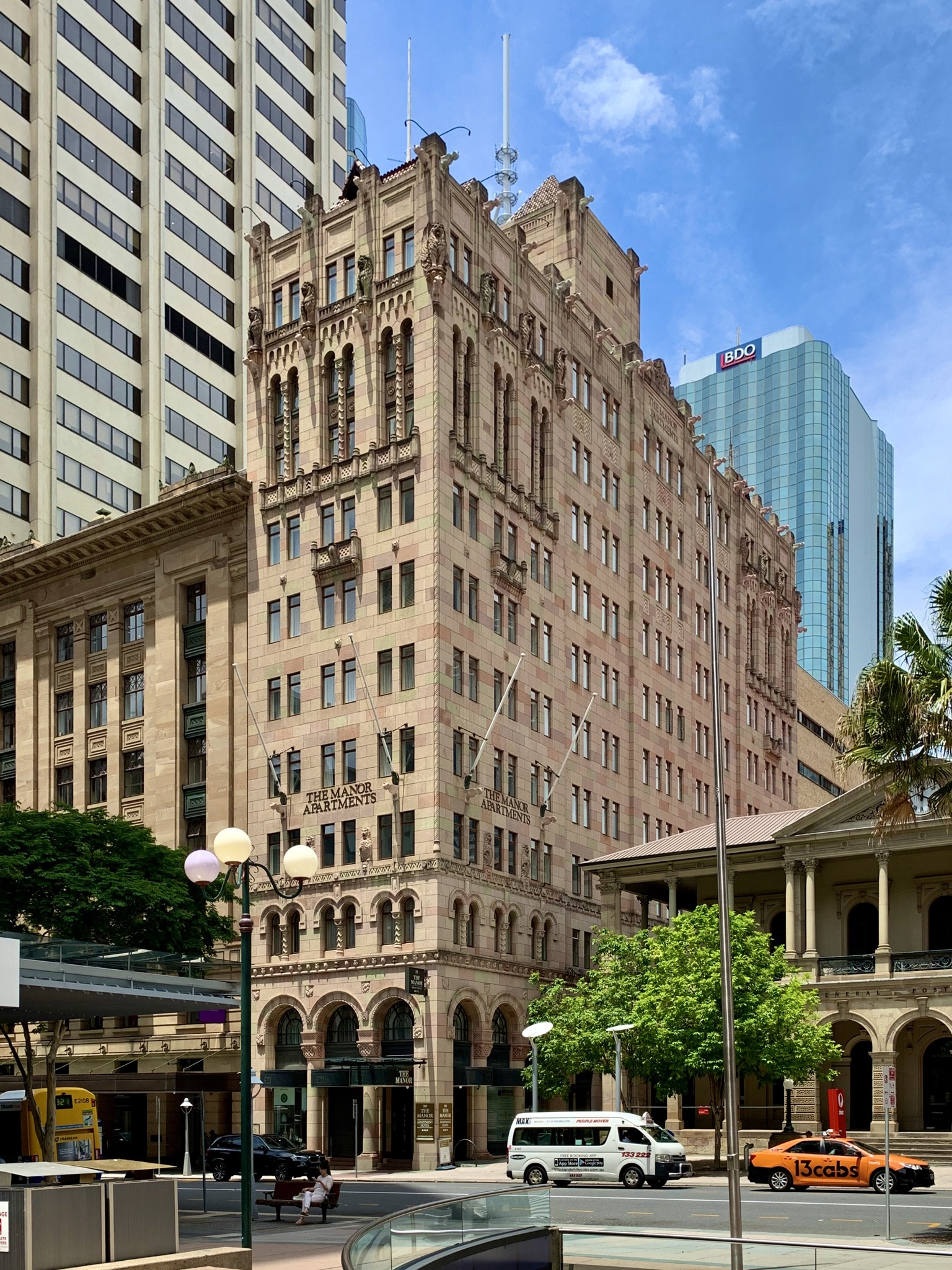
Manor Apartment Hotel

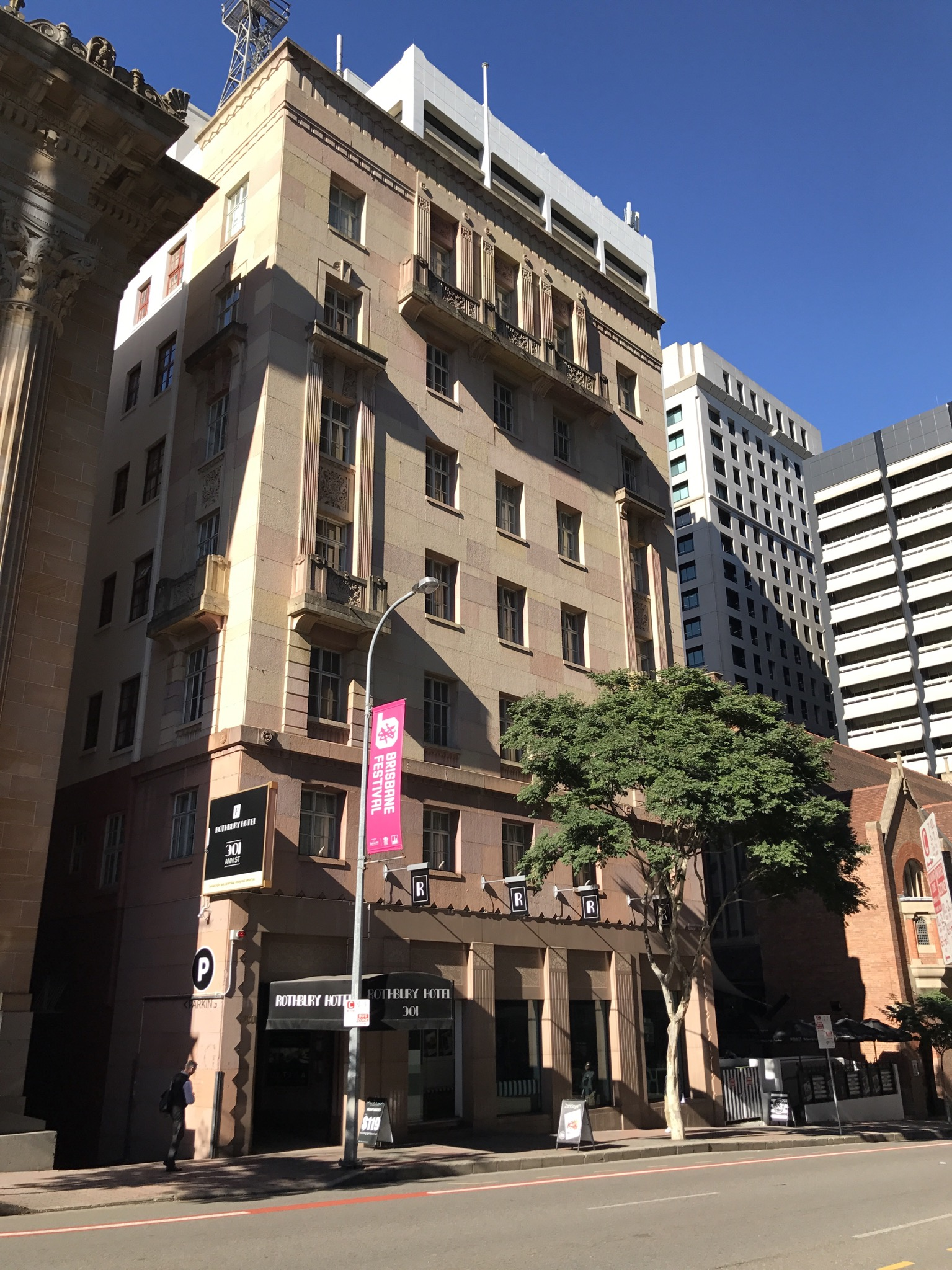
Shell House

== Benedict stone ==
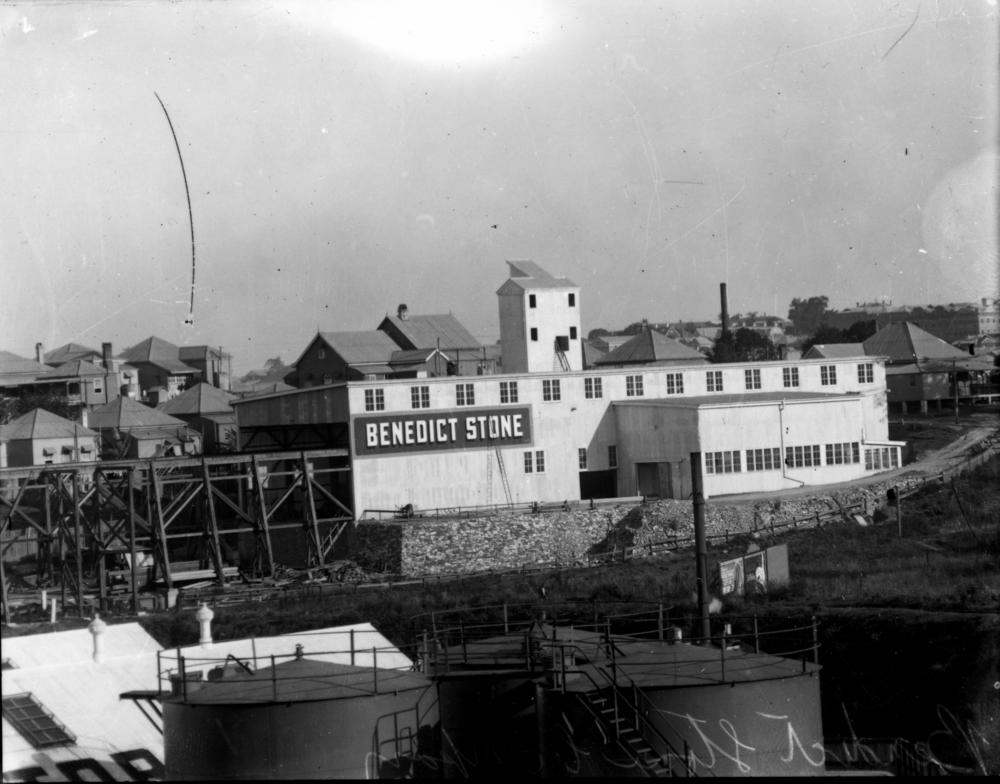
Benedict Stone Factory at Bowen Hills, circa 1934

Benedict stone is a mixture of cement and crushed Brisbane tuff used on building facades as an alternative to full stone construction. It was manufactured by Benedict Stone (Qld) Pty Ltd which was established by Roman Catholic Archbishop of Brisbane, James Duhig, to manufacture the stone required for the Holy Name Cathedral, Fortitude Valley. The product was developed at the turn of the twentieth century by American manufacturer, Benedict. Duhig obtained a licence from America and opened the Benedict Stone works at Bowen Hills on 9 August 1929. In February 1930 Colonial Mutual Life (CML) advanced Duhig a £70,000 mortgage on his properties which included the stone works. A mutually-dependent relationship developed between CML, Duhig and Jack Hennessey, architect. CML used Benedict stone to build a number of their Australian offices, ensuring some of their mortgage was repaid and employed Hennessey and Concrete Constructions (Qld) Ltd, Brisbane (Duhig's architect and contractor for the Holy Name Cathedral).

== Tunnelling ==
The extent and hardness of Brisbane tuff deposits has often been a barrier to building tunnels in Brisbane due to its 100–150 megapascal strength. However, since 2007, advances in tunnel-boring equipment with tungsten carbide cutting heads has enabled a number of major tunnels to be constructed in Brisbane, e.g. the Clem Jones Tunnel which passes through the Kangaroo Point area.
