= Windsor Town Quarry Park and Tramways Substation No. 6 =

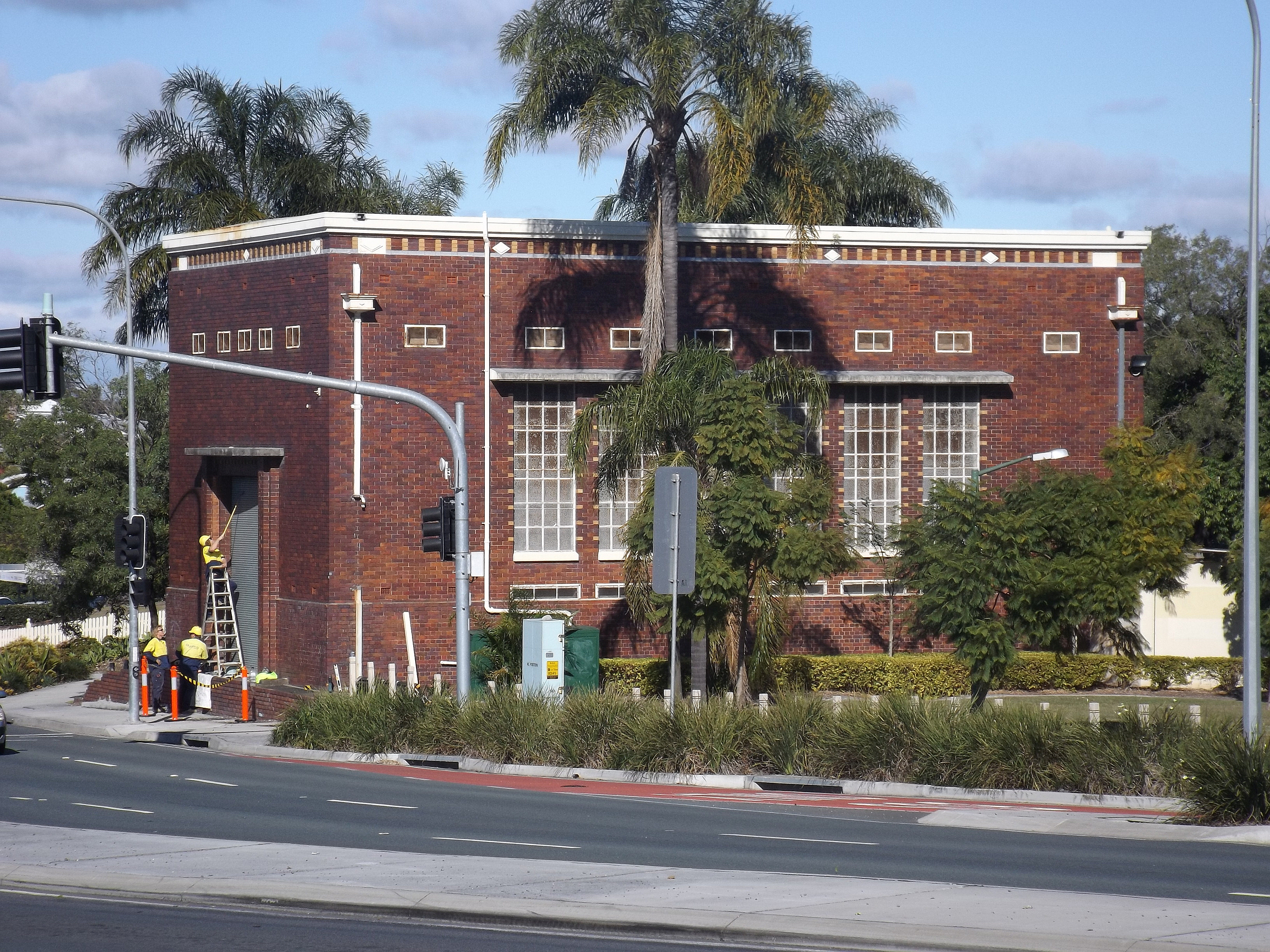
- Substation building, 2015

- Location within Queensland Location within Australia
- 27.4282°S 153.0324°E
- Location: 356 Lutwyche Road, Windsor, City of Brisbane, Queensland, Australia

History
- Design period: 1919–1930s (interwar period)
- Built: c. 1926–c. 1928

Site notes
- Architect: Roy Rusden Ogg
- Architectural style: Classicism

Queensland Heritage Register
- Official name: BCC Tramways Substation No. 6 and Windsor Town Quarry Park (former)
- Type: state heritage (landscape, built)
- Designated: 31 May 2005
- Reference no.: 602492
- Significant period: c. 1926–1948 (historical, fabric)
- Significant components: substation – tramway, machinery/plant/equipment – transport – rail, views to, park / green space, quarry, crane / gantry, platform

Windsor Town Quarry Park and Tramways Substation No. 6 is a heritage-listed former quarry with electrical substation at 356 Lutwyche Road, Windsor in the City of Brisbane, Queensland, Australia. It was built from c. 1926 to c. 1928. The park and substation were added to the Queensland Heritage Register on 31 May 2005. There is another, larger substation building, Tramways Substation No. 13 which was designed by Frank Gibson Costello and became operational in June 1949.

== Quarry History ==
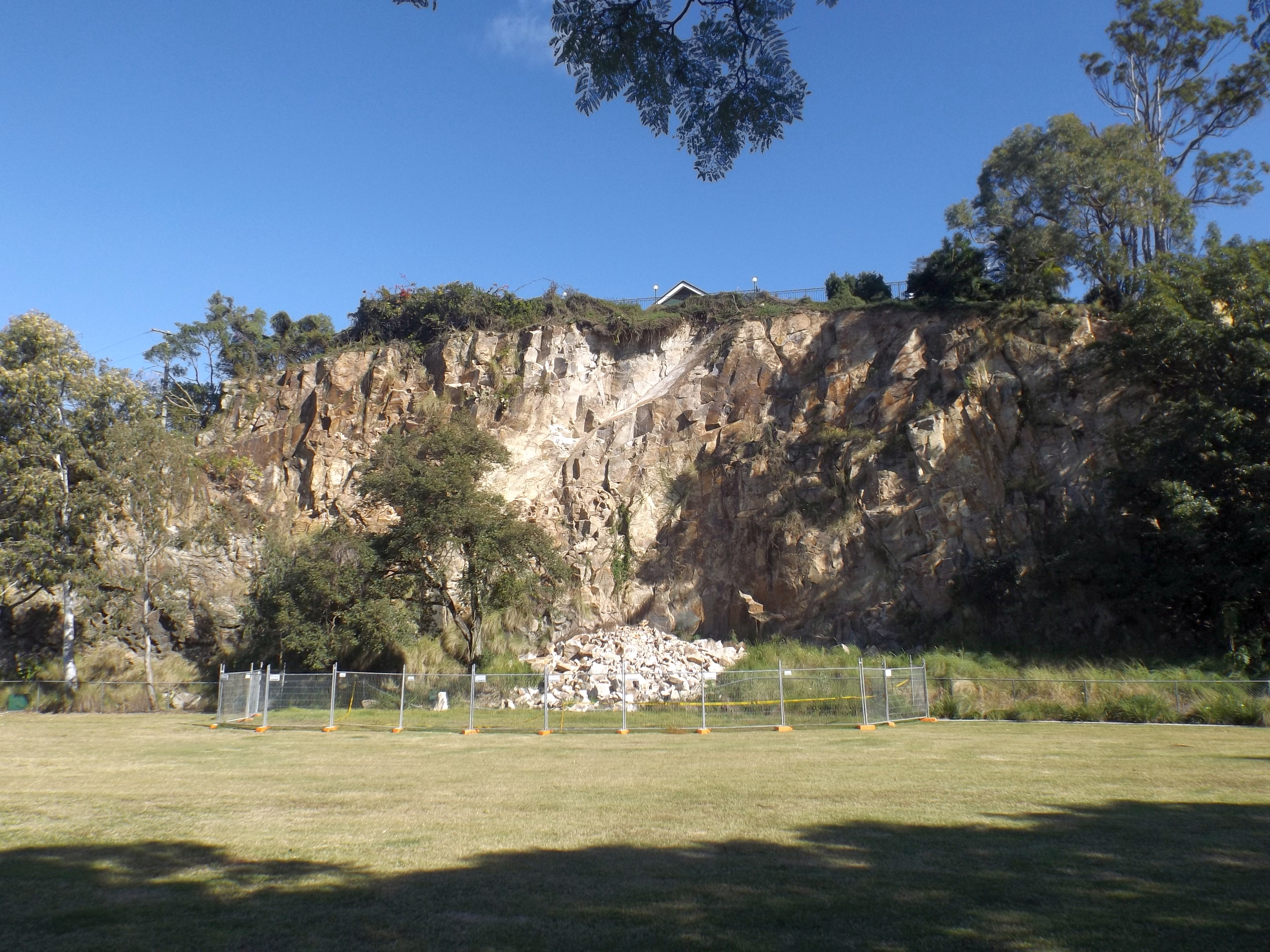
Quarry cliff and park, 2015

A seam of Brisbane tuff forms part of the Enoggera fault line and was formed by being deposited on the shore and in the shallow waters of small Triassic lakes. This stone was found to be suitable for construction in the early stages of European settlement in Queensland. The original hill of the Windsor quarry sloped across Lutwyche Road and down to Albion Road. Nehemiah Bartley acquired the land in the first land sales in 1859, though he sold it in the mid-1860s. Stone was probably removed first in the 1860s as the hill was lowered to allow development of a road, though in the 1870s it still formed a hump in the road and vehicles tended to drive around it.

The Ithaca Divisional Board was formed in 1879 and quarried stone from the hill. In 1887 Windsor became a Shire and the quarry was transferred to it in 1888. The local tuff provided an excellent source of building material for the new Shire and districts beyond and was worked by both private enterprise and the town council. In 1897, the Windsor Town Council Chambers was constructed from the stone, as were a number of local buildings, roadside kerbing and drains. The stonemason's office stood near the corner of Haddock Street at the base of the hill.

In 1904 Windsor became a municipality comprising Albion, Wooloowin, Wilston, Lutwyche, Newmarket, Swan Hill and part of Eagle Junction and Kedron. A stone crushing plant was constructed at the quarry in 1914 and the road metal produced greatly facilitated road development in the area. By the 1920s the quarry is thought to have been largely worked out and quarrying may not have continued beyond the establishment of the substation in 1927.

The Brisbane City Council works department used the quarry floor as a depot for some years before it was redeveloped as a park. It was gazetted for this purpose on 1 August 1976 and was redeveloped as a park in 1988. The quarry face that remains today displays an unconformity between the metamorphic Neranleigh-Fernvale beds of rock and the Brisbane tuff seam and is a striking feature of the park.

== Substation History ==
The former Brisbane City Council Tramways Substation No. 6 was operational between 1927 and 1948 and is situated adjacent to an open parkland area created from a former quarry at Windsor.

=== The Tramways Power Network ===
The Metropolitan Tramway and Investment Co. Ltd operated horse-drawn trams in Brisbane from August 1885. The first public supply of electricity in Brisbane was from a generator in Edison Lane, which supplied the General Post Office in 1888. Early development in the industry was in the hands of a number of private companies and the situation was complex because the metropolitan area comprised fourteen separate local authorities. After various liquidations and restructurings, the City Electric Light Company Limited (CEL) was established in 1904. Parallel development took place in electric traction. The Brisbane Tramways Company, a private enterprise formed in 1895, introduced the first electric trams to Brisbane in 1897 after purchasing the early horse car system, converting it to electric operation and expanding and extending the routes. A power station to supply current to the electric trams was constructed in Countess Street in 1897.

As the tramway system extended out into the suburbs, this power station was unable to provide all the energy needed. Two engine sets from Countess Street were transferred to a building in Logan Road to provide a feeding point for the system on the south side of the river. Supply was also fed from the tramway 550-volt DC mains to a number of establishments along the tramway routes, such as butcher shops, sawmills and factories. By 1918, the whole of the tramways public power supply equipment in South Brisbane was sold to the City Electric Light Company, which developed a supply for South Brisbane from its power station in William Street. At the conclusion of the First World War there was general support for the notion that the tramway system should be owned and operated by a public authority. In 1922, an Act of Parliament inaugurated the Brisbane Tramway Trust.

In 1925 the many small local authorities were amalgamated into the Greater Brisbane City Council, creating a single public authority that could plan for the provision of electrical services throughout the entire city. Expansion of electricity supply and the development of better public transport networks were important issues for the Council and were closely linked to suburban development. At this time energy generation and supply was chaotic. Three small obsolete power stations generated energy for trams and electricity for Ithaca and Toowong and the supply for all other suburbs was purchased in bulk from CEL under 10 year agreements.

The 1920s and 1930s was a period of tramways expansion following the Greater Brisbane Council's acquisition of the tramways system from the Brisbane Tramways Trust in 1925. In 1926 the Council, anxious to control the city's electricity supply, decided to build its own powerhouse at New Farm, under the supervision of the BCC Tramways Department. Opened on 28 June 1928, New Farm Power Station distributed 1100 KW AC power to a network of 10 suburban tramways substations erected in the 1920s and 1930s.

=== The Tramways Substations (1927–1940) ===
The substations were located at strategic points throughout the system - substations No. 2 (Russell Street) and No. 6 (Windsor) came into service in 1927, No. 4 (Petrie Terrace) and No. 5 (Newstead) in 1928; Substation No. 9 (Norman Park) came on line in 1935.

Prior to 1940, their design was the responsibility of BCC Tramways Department architect and construction engineer, Roy Rusden Ogg. In conjunction with the tramway's chief engineers Nelson and Arundell, he designed 10 Brisbane substations between 1926 and 1936 and the first two stages of the New Farm powerhouse.

Name	Original No	Address	Commissioning Date	Existence	Heritage	Details
Ballow St	1	Ballow St, Fortitude Valley	Operational in June 1928.	Still existing.	No heritage listing	This Electrical Control Room and Substation building is located on a block of land between Ballow and Constance Streets in Fortitude Valley. Upon the tramways demise in 1969 it was turned into an Electricity Department Depot, which was absorbed by SEQEB (Later Energex) in 1977. The site was sold by Energex in 1998.
Russell St	2	Russell St, South Brisbane	Operational in February 1927.	No longer in existence.	N/A	In 1985 the substation site was incorporated into the overall site for Expo 88, when the parkland was extended with almost all properties between Stanley Street, Vulture Street, the railway and Russell Street were demolished and roads also cleared for the site of Expo 88. Photos of the demolition exist. The Russell Street Tramways Substation along with the old City Electric Light Company (later Southern Electric Authority of Queensland or SEAQ) Stanley Street Substation next to Ship Inn were both demolished to make way for Expo 88.
Logan Road	3	Logan Road, Wooloongabba	Operational in June 1928.	No longer in-situ.	N/A	The building was relocated to Murgen. A tin shed, Tramways Substation No. 3 was not like the other substations, and may have had minimal involvement from Ogg.
Petrie Terrace	4	Petrie Terrace, Paddington	Operational in August 1928.	Existing	Local Heritage Listing (Place ID 322)	Notable as one of two substation that still retain the Brisbane Tramways Logo and number still.
Newstead	5	199 Breakfast Creek Road, Newstead	Operational in July 1928.	Existing	State Heritage Listed (Place ID 600265)	Listed as part of Newstead House and Park. Since the closure of the tram system in 1969 the substation was purchased by the Newstead House Board of Trustees and has been used as a Resource Centre and offices for management staff. Notable as one of two substation that still retain the Brisbane Tramways Logo and number still.
Windsor (Old)	6	Windsor Town Quarry Park	Operational in February 1927.	Existing	State Heritage Listed (Place ID 602492).	Unlike the other substations which were decommissioned in 1969, Windsor was replaced in June 1949.
Paddington	7	150 Ennoggera Terrace, Paddington	Operational in August 1930.	Existing	State Heritage Listed (Place ID 601198).	The substation commenced operation on 11 August 1930 and remained in service until the phasing out of Brisbane's trams in the late 1960s. In 1969 the Paddington line was closed, the substation's electrical equipment was removed, and the building became a storage depot. In 1985, Hands On Art was given a fifteen-year lease of the building. In 2014, Hands On Art was still operating from the building and was running monthly "vintage and artisan" markets.
Kedron	8	134 Kedron Park Road, Wooloowin	Operational in August 1935.	Existing	State Heritage Listed (Place ID 602411).	The building became a State Emergency Services Depot and changes were made to the interior to accommodate this use. The lower level of the original two level floor has been extended to park a rescue boat and a mezzanine level was inserted in the mid 1980s. A single storey brick garage has been added.
Norman Park	9	97 Wynnum Road, Norman Park	Operational in November 1935.	Existing	State Heritage Listed (Place ID 602410).	Since 2007, the substation has been leased by Metro Arts as artists studios.
Annerley	10	413 Ipswich Road, Annerley	Operational in August 1936.	Existing	Local Heritage Listing (Place ID 59)	Substation is now part of the Junction Hotel site, with the substation in use as a restaurant.

Table data sourced from the Brisbane City Archives.

Considerable attention was given to the design of the substations serving the tramway system. The architecture was marked by the stylistic preferences of the individual architects, the Brisbane City Tramways architect Roy Rusden Ogg and later City Architect Frank Gibson Costello. Although they were robust utility buildings, generally small in scale, elegant proportions and such details as finely crafted brickwork distinguished them.

=== The Tramways Substation No.6 (Windsor – Old) ===
The former Brisbane City Council Tramways Substation at Windsor is the smallest of the substations designed by Ogg. Ogg also designed the Tramways Departments Head Office building on Coronation Drive in 1929.

It proved too small to accommodate the requirements of the expanding network and was replaced in 1948 by a larger substation to the design of City Architect Frank Gibson Costello, Tramways Substation No. 13 located to the south of the reserve.

After its decommissioning the building was used as a chemical store for the Department of Health and Community Services Entomological and Rodent Control Section and now accommodates an assortment of equipment and chemicals. Material related to its use as a substation was donated to Windsor and District Historical Society. The roof was re-sheeted in 1985 and new rainwater goods installed. Landscaping has been carried out around the building.

=== The Tramways Substation No.13 (Windsor – New) ===
Tramways Substation No. 13 which was designed by Frank Gibson Costello and became operational in June 1949, and appears to also be within the Windsor Town Quarry Park, but is on separate lot, which is an electricity reserve managed by Energex.

== Description ==
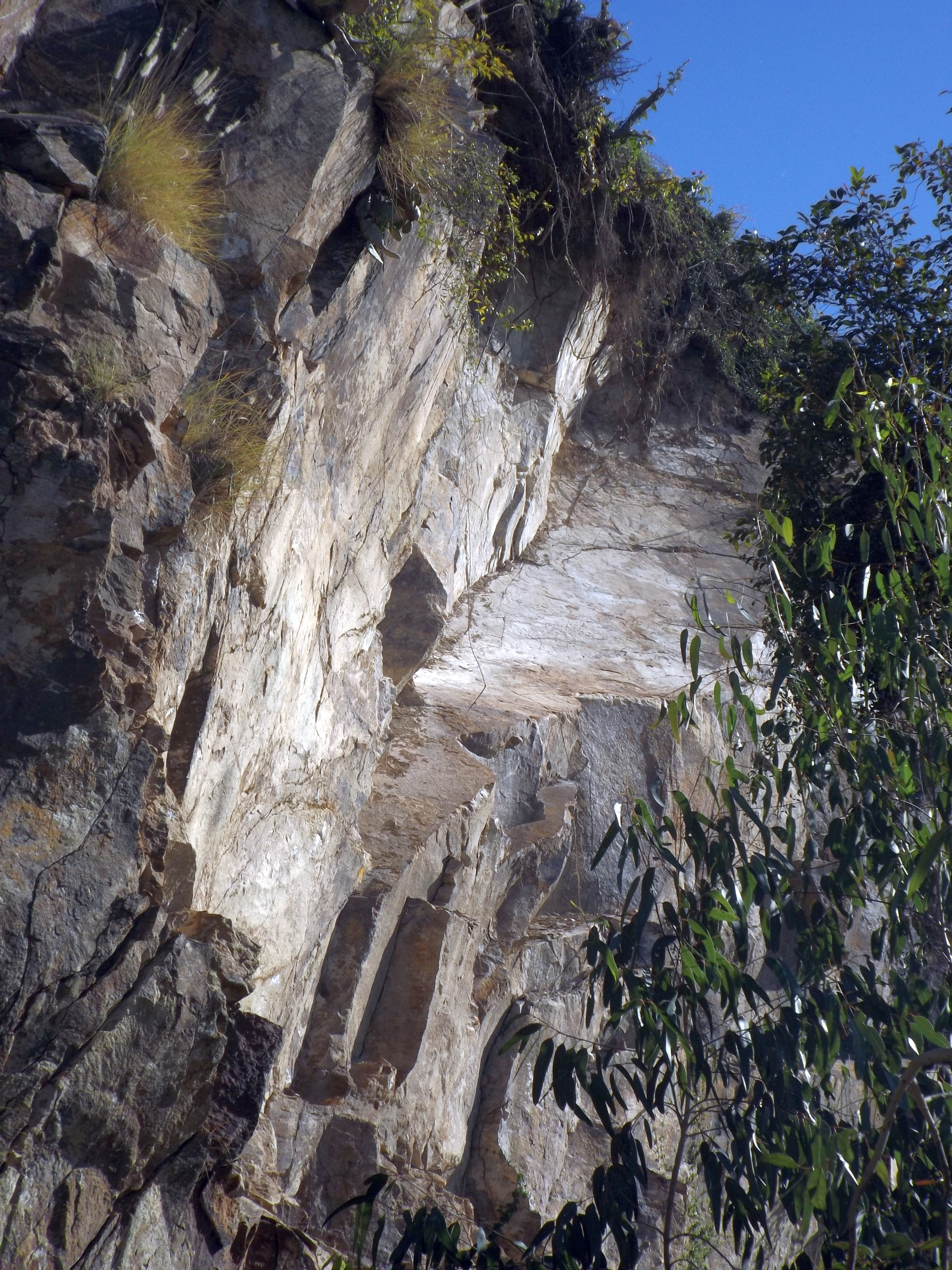
Photo of cliff at Windsor Town Quarry Park and Tramways Substation No. 6 at Windsor, Brisbane, Queensland, Australia.

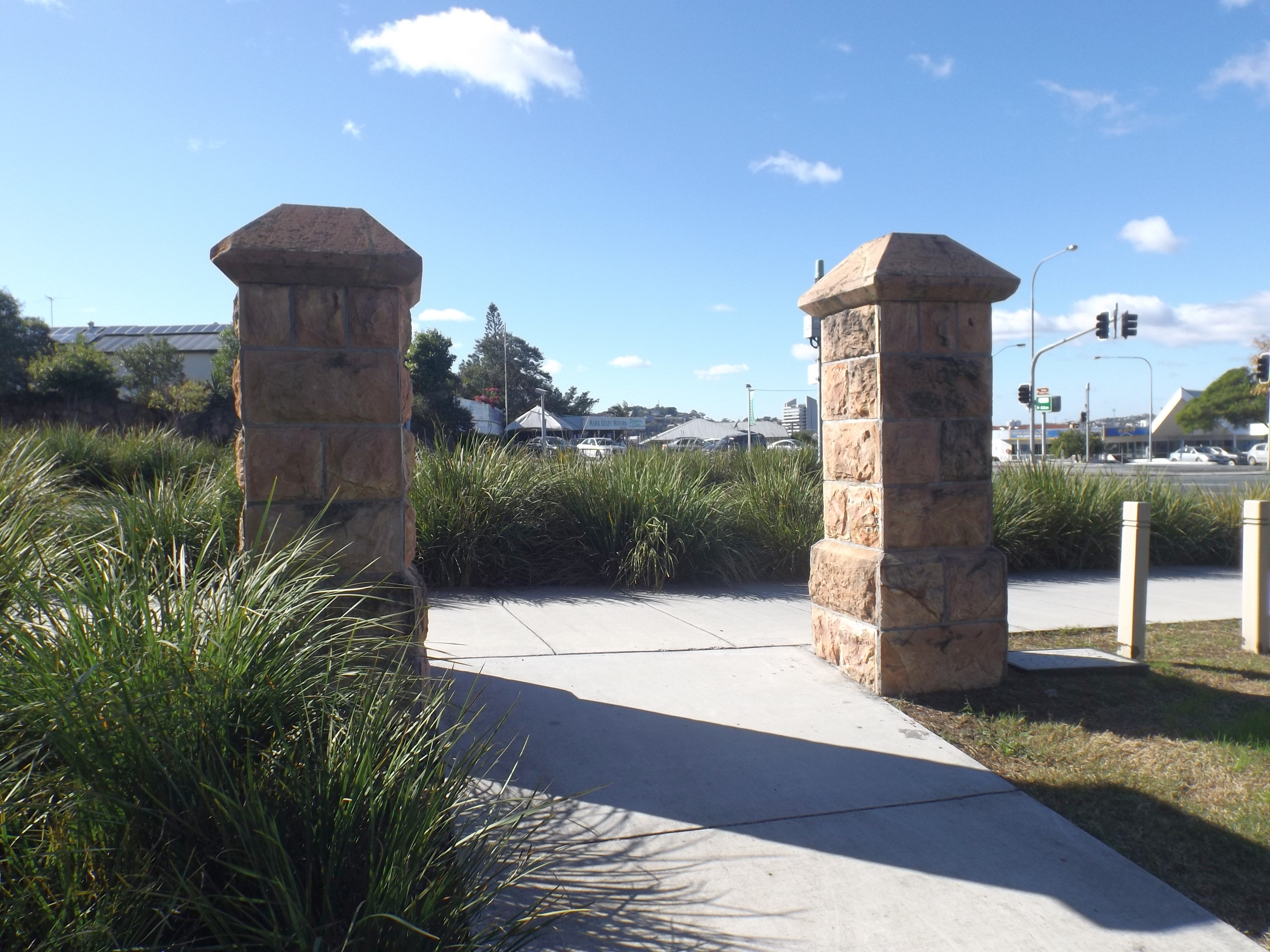
Footpath entrance, 2015

The former Brisbane City Council Tramway Substation No. 6 and Windsor Town Quarry Park occupy an irregular block that is part of an island of land, bounded by Goodacre and Flaherty Streets and Lutwyche Road, that also contains the former Windsor Shire Council Chambers, the Hawkins Street road reserve and a former Energex substation on separate lots.

The quarry face to the western side dominates the park. This sheer rock wall is topped by a brilliant splash of bougainvillea, which adds to its landmark qualities. It rises abruptly from a level grassed area. A path runs through the park on a north–south axis. Recently constructed sandstone clad gateposts mark the entrance from Lutwyche Road. Bedded out plantings edge the park along Lutwyche Road and there are also plantings of ornamental trees scattered about the park.

There is a small, asphalted car park to the south and the former tramways substation is at the northern end of the park close to Lutwyche Road. It is a two-storey building of austere appearance, symmetrical in form, and has load-bearing walls of red glazed bricks set on a concrete plinth. The roof is hipped and is clad with modern coated metal sheeting. The front of the building is divided into bays by brick pilasters and has a decorative cornice of moulded render with small square openings set below wide eaves. The front entrance is placed centrally below a square window set with multiple panes of glass. There are fixed rectangular windows of similar style in the flanking bays and on the sides of the substation. These windows are steel framed and have exterior mesh security grilles. The doors to the front and side of the building have metal roller shutters. There is a later addition in the form of a single story skillion roofed section to the rear to which a brick toilet has been added.

The interior of the substation is painted and the ceilings are clad in fibrous cement sheeting with timber battens. The floors are concrete and there is a suspended mezzanine floor accessed by a steel ladder. The internal space is divided by a brick wall, which has a doorway at the northern end and an opening adjacent to the site of the rectifier at the southern end. Marks on the rear section show where the AC and DC cubicles have been removed.

The steel gantry survives and appears to be functional. Any remaining evidence for machinery mountings on the floor are obscured by timber flooring in the transformer room and material stored in the rectifier room. Marks and fixings on walls indicated where equipment was once attached.

== Heritage listing ==
BCC Tramways Substation No. 6 and Windsor Town Quarry Park (former) was listed on the Queensland Heritage Register on 31 May 2005 having satisfied the following criteria.

The place is important in demonstrating the evolution or pattern of Queensland's history.

The former tramway substation is important in demonstrating a vital aspect of Queensland's industrial development and is closely linked to Brisbane's suburban expansion in the 1920s and 30s and with the development of the electricity supply system. The exposed face of the former quarry, now the main feature of the park between the substation and Windsor Shire Council Chambers, is evidence for the former industrial use of the site as a source of stone for buildings and road construction.

The place demonstrates rare, uncommon or endangered aspects of Queensland's cultural heritage.

The former substation is now uncommon evidence for an important mode of transport, which was discontinued in Brisbane in 1969 and for which much of the infrastructure has since been removed. The quarry wall has an inclined fault where Brisbane tuff meets phyllite, which is significant as a geological rarity.

The place is important in demonstrating the principal characteristics of a particular class of cultural places.

In design, scale and materials, the former substation is important in demonstrating the principal characteristics of the Brisbane tramways substations. Due to the quality of its design and materials it successfully combines function with a pleasing appearance.

As a well-conceived utility structure, the substation is important as a fine example of the municipal work of tramways architect Roy Rusden Ogg.

The place is important because of its aesthetic significance.

As the substation and the adjoining park with its landmark quarry cliff are prominently sited on a major road, they make an important contribution to the visual character of the area. The quarry face, in particular, is a landmark that is emphasised by being floodlit at night.

The place has a special association with the life or work of a particular person, group or organisation of importance in Queensland's history.

As a well-conceived utility structure, the substation is important as a fine example of the municipal work of tramways architect Roy Rusden Ogg.

== See also ==
- Trams in Brisbane
- Paddington Tramways Substation No. 7 at Paddington
- Brisbane City Council Tramways Substation No. 8 at Wooloowin
- Brisbane City Council Tramway Substation No 9 at Norman Park
