= Brisbane City Council Tramways Substation No 9 =

Brisbane City Council Tramways Substation No. 9
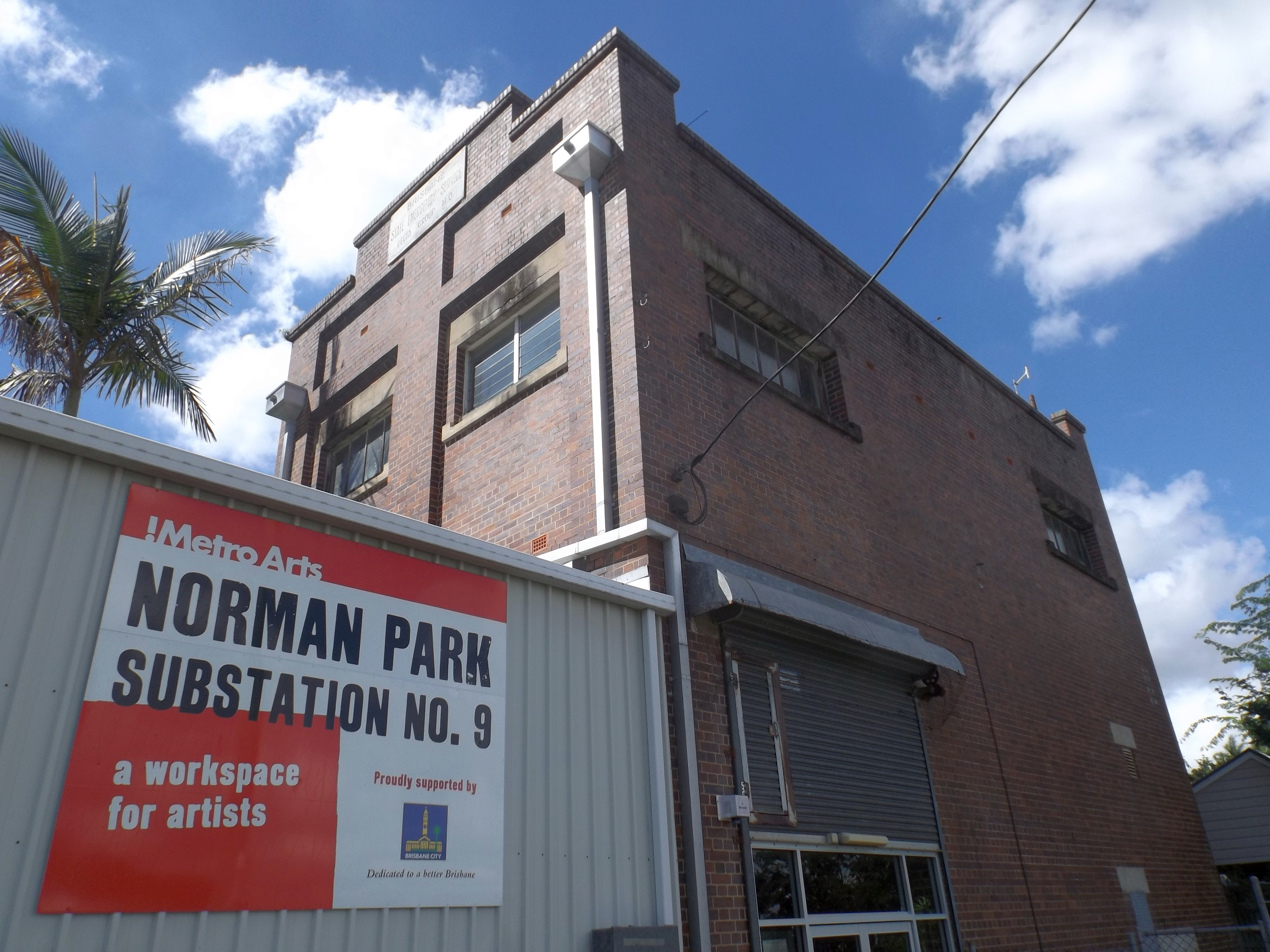
- Structure in 2015

- Location within Queensland Location within Australia
- 27.4749°S 153.0551°E
- Location: 97 Wynnum Road, Norman Park, Queensland, Australia

History
- Design period: 1919–1930s (interwar period)
- Built: 1935

Site notes
- Architectural style: Classicism

Queensland Heritage Register
- Official name: Brisbane City Council Tramway Substation No 9 (former)
- Type: state heritage (built)
- Designated: 5 August 2003
- Reference no.: 602410
- Significant period: 1935–1969 (historical)
- Significant components: crane / gantry, substation – tramway, platform, views to

Brisbane City Council Tramways Substation No. 9 is a heritage-listed electrical substation at 97 Wynnum Road, Norman Park, Queensland, Australia. It was built in 1935. It was added to the Queensland Heritage Register on 5 August 2003.

== History ==
The former Brisbane City Council Tramways substation no 9 was built to the design of Brisbane City Council Tramways architect Roy Rusden Ogg around 1935 during a period of tramways expansion.

Horse-drawn trams operated in Brisbane from August 1885, operated by an English company, Metropolitan Tramway and Investment Co. Ltd. The first public supply of electricity in Brisbane was from a generator in Edison Lane, which supplied the General Post Office in 1888. Early development in the industry was in the hands of a number of private companies and the situation was complex because the metropolitan area comprised fourteen separate local authorities. After various liquidations and restructurings the City Electric Light Company Limited (CEL) was established in 1904. Parallel development took place in electric traction. The Brisbane Tramways Company, a private enterprise formed in 1895, introduced the first electric trams to Brisbane in 1897 after purchasing the early horse car system, converting it to electric operation and expanding and extending the routes. A power station to supply current to the electric trams was constructed in Countess Street in 1897.

The tramway system extended out into the suburbs, the Countess Street power station was unable to supply all the energy requirements. Two engine sets from Countess Street were transferred to a building in Logan Road to provide for a feeding point for the system on the south side of the river. Supply was also fed from the tramway 550-volt DC mains to a number of establishments along the tramway routes, such as butcher shops, sawmills and factories. By 1918, the whole of the tramways public power supply equipment in South Brisbane was sold to the City Electric Light Company, which developed a supply for South Brisbane from its power station in William Street. At the conclusion of the First World War there was general support for the notion that the tramway system be owned and operated by a public authority rather than a private company. In 1922, an Act of Parliament inaugurated the Brisbane Tramway Trust.

The establishment in 1925 of the Brisbane City Council created a single public authority that could plan for the provision of electrical services throughout the entire city. Expansion of electricity supply and the development of better public transport networks were important issues for the Greater Brisbane City Council and were closely linked to suburban development. At this time the situation of energy generation and supply was chaotic. Three small obsolete power stations generated energy for trams and electricity for Ithaca and Toowong and the supply for all other suburbs was purchased in bulk from CEL under 10 year agreements.

The 1920s and 1930s was a period of tramways expansion following the BCC acquisition of the tramways system from the Brisbane Tramways Trust in 1925. In 1926 the Greater Brisbane Council, anxious to control the city's electricity supply, decided to build its own powerhouse at New Farm, under the supervision of the BCC Tramways Department. Opened on 28 June 1928, New Farm Power Station distributed 1100 kW AC power to a network of 11 suburban tramways substations erected in the 1920s and 1930s. The substations were located at strategic points throughout the system - substations No. 2 (Russell Street) and No. 6 (Windsor) came into service in 1927, No. 4 (Petrie Terrace) and No. 5 (Newstead) in 1928; Substation No. 9 (Norman Park) came on line in 1935.

Considerable attention was given to the design of the substations serving the tramway system. The architecture was marked by the stylistic preferences of individual architects particularly the Brisbane City Architects AH Foster and FG Costello and the BCC Tramways architect RR Ogg. Although they were robust utility buildings, generally small in scale, elegant proportions and such details as finely crafted brickwork distinguished them. Prior to 1940, their design was the responsibility of BCC Tramways Department architect and construction engineer, Roy Rusden Ogg. In conjunction with the tramway's chief engineers Nelson and Arundell, he designed at least 10 Brisbane substations between 1926 and 1936 and the first two stages of the New Farm powerhouse. Ogg also designed the Tramways Departments Head Office building on Coronation Drive in 1929.

The Norman Park substation remained in service until the phasing out of Brisbane's trams in the late 1960s. In 1969 the line was closed and the substation's electrical equipment was removed, though the travelling crane remains. The building became a State Emergency Services Depot and changes were made to the interior to accommodate this use. The lower level of the original two level floor has been extended to park a rescue boat and a steel and timber framed mezzanine floor has been inserted in the main building space. A single storey garage was added on the northern side

Since 2007, the substation has been leased by Metro Arts as artists' studios. Its newfound role has attracted the opening of the ArtWorld Studio Gallery on the adjacent Bodalla Street.

== Description ==
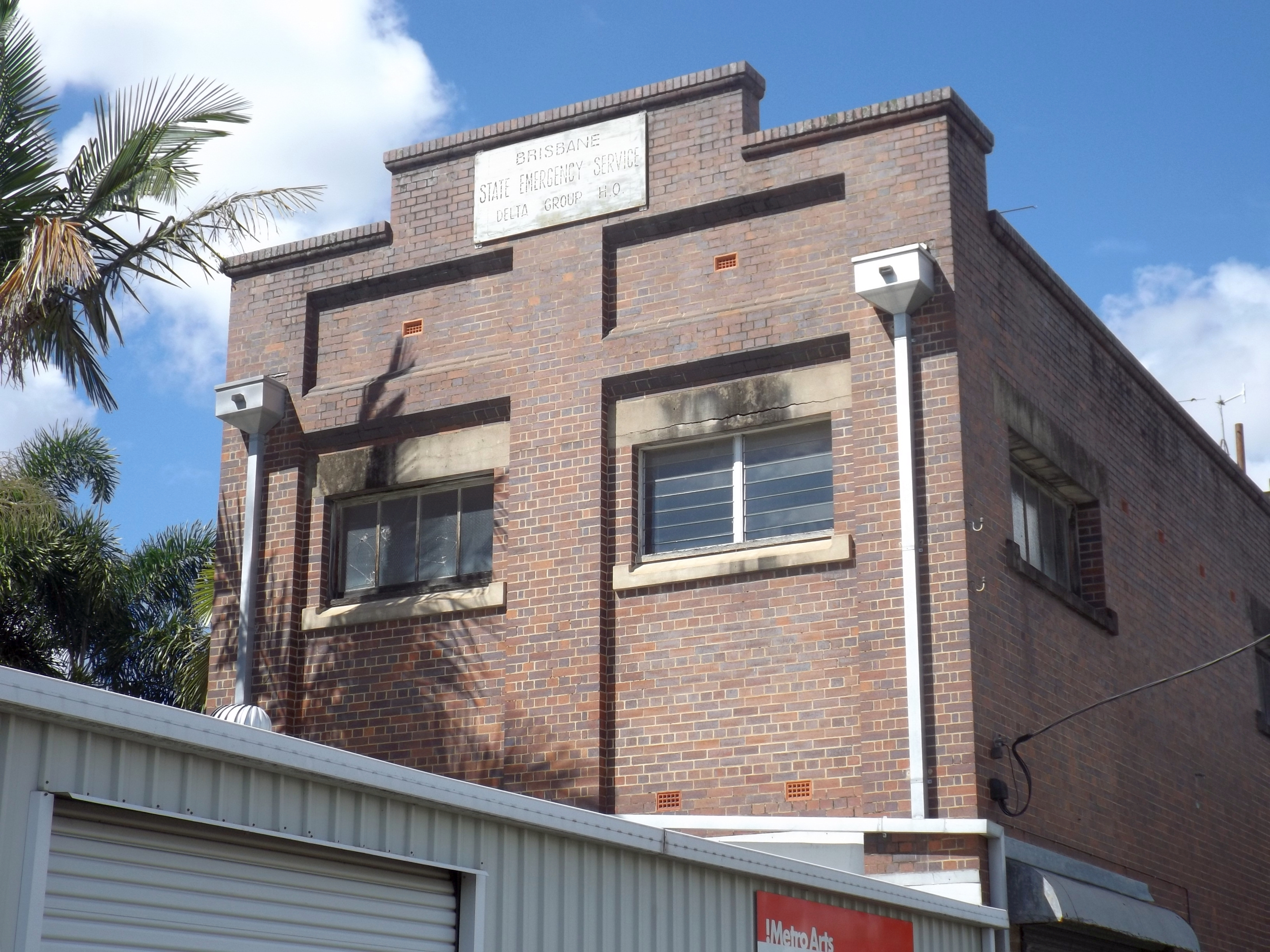
Upper floor, 2015

The former substation is a two-storey building of austere appearance and is constructed of dark, glazed brick. It occupies most of the block at the corner of Wynnum Road and Norman Avenue with its long axis at right angles to Wynnum Road to the north.

The metal clad roof is concealed by a stepped parapet and engaged piers form shallow decorative panels in the brickwork. The building is placed on a flush rendered plinth and the high window openings have heads and sills of concrete render. Finely detailed sheet metal rainwater heads and downpipes are prominently placed on the north and south elevations and contribute to the verticality of the design. The western side, facing Norman Avenue, features a large steel roller shutter protected by a curved metal hood.

The southern end of the building has been extended to accommodate a toilet. This single storey extension features panels of English bond and garden bond brickwork formed between engaged corner piers. Remnant concrete slabs and brick walls provide evidence of previous structures near this extension.

The interior has been modified to accommodate State Emergency Service use. A steel and timber framed floor has been inserted into the main volume of the building and the ceiling formed is lined with fibrous cement sheeting finished with timber cover strips. The lower level of the original floor is used to park a rescue boat and accommodates a secure mesh enclosure. A kitchen and dining area occupy the upper level of this floor. The original travelling crane remains, running north south for the entire length of the building and supported on steel rails resting on corbelled brickwork. All of the internal brickwork has been painted white.

A sheet metal and concrete block garage has been erected between the former substation and Wynnum Road.

== Heritage listing ==
The former Brisbane City Council Tramways Substation No 9 was listed on the Queensland Heritage Register on 5 August 2003 having satisfied the following criteria.

The place is important in demonstrating the evolution or pattern of Queensland's history.

The former tramways substation is important in demonstrating an important aspect of Queensland's industrial development and is closely linked to Brisbane's suburban expansion in the 1920s and 30s and with the development of the electricity supply system.

The place demonstrates rare, uncommon or endangered aspects of Queensland's cultural heritage.

The former substation is now uncommon evidence for an important mode of transport, which was discontinued in Brisbane in 1969 and for which much of the infrastructure has since been removed.

The place is important in demonstrating the principal characteristics of a particular class of cultural places.

In design, scale and materials, the former substation is important in demonstrating the principal characteristics of the Brisbane tramways substations.

As a well-conceived utility structure, it is important as a fine example of the municipal work of tramways architect Roy Rusden Ogg.

The place is important because of its aesthetic significance.

The former substation contributes to the streetscape, its quality of design and materials enabling the prominently placed building to successfully combine function and a pleasing appearance.

The place has a special association with the life or work of a particular person, group or organisation of importance in Queensland's history.

As a well-conceived utility structure, it is important as a fine example of the municipal work of tramways architect Roy Rusden Ogg.

== See also ==
- Newstead House, Brisbane, the location of Brisbane Tramways Substation No. 5.
- Brisbane Tramways Substation No. 6 at Windsor
- Brisbane Tramways Substation No. 7 at Paddington
- Brisbane City Council Tramways Substation No. 8 at Wooloowin
- Trams in Brisbane
