= Norman Park, Queensland =

Norman Park
- Suburb
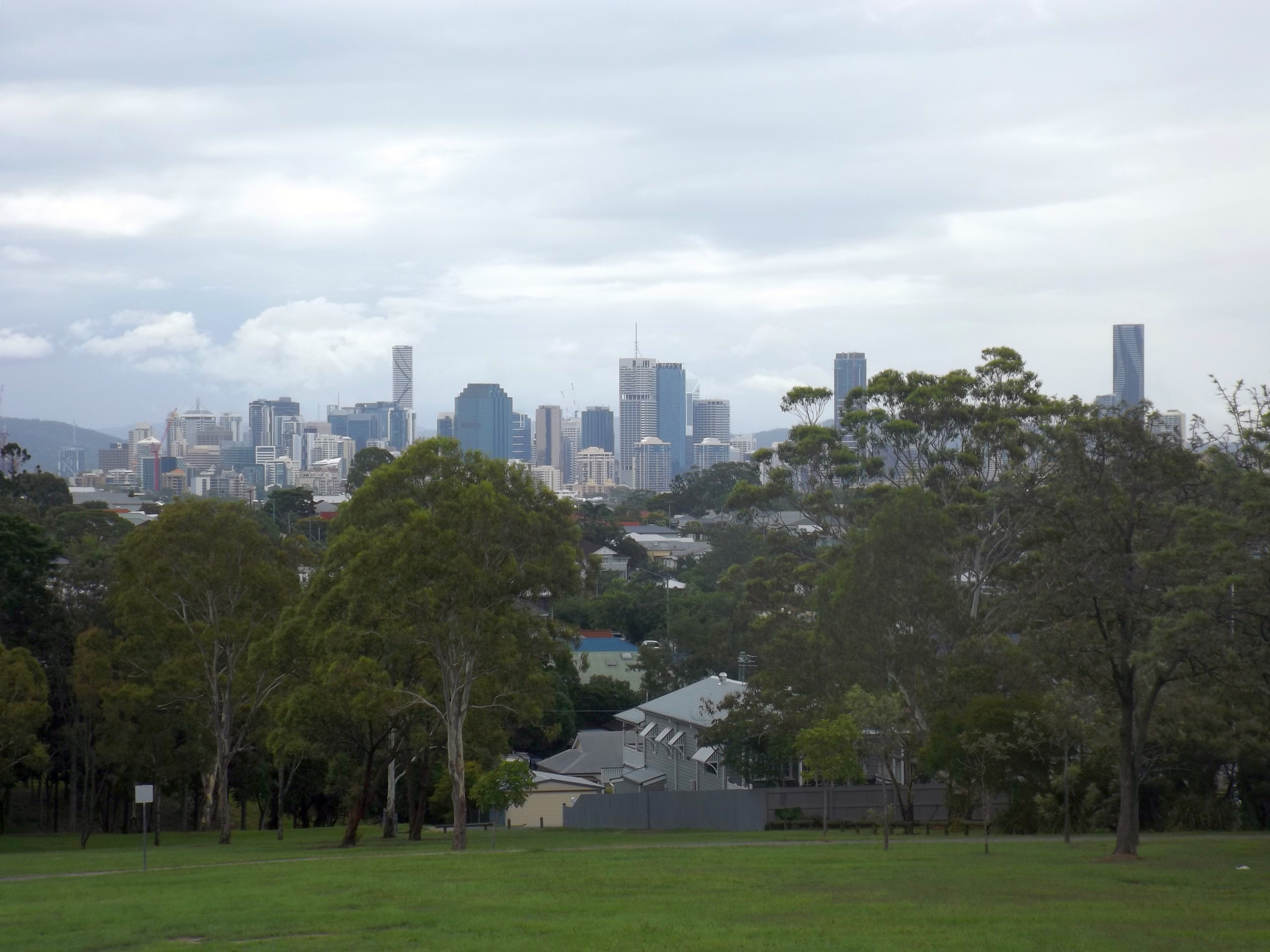
- Brisbane central business district seen from Norman Park

- Interactive map of Norman Park
- Coordinates: 27.4791°S 153.0625°E
- Country: Australia
- State: Queensland
- City: Brisbane
- LGA: City of Brisbane (Morningside Ward)
- Location: 6.3 km (3.9 mi) E of Brisbane CBD

Government
  - State electorates: Bulimba; Greenslopes
  - Federal division: Griffith

Area
  - Total: 2.3 km^{2} (0.89 sq mi)

Population
  - Total: 6,842 (2021 census)
  - Density: 2,970/km^{2} (7,700/sq mi)
- Time zone: UTC+10:00 (AEST)
- Postcode: 4170
Suburbs around Norman Park
New Farm	Hawthorne	Morningside
East Brisbane	Norman Park	Seven Hills
Coorparoo	Camp Hill	Camp Hill

Norman Park is a suburb in the City of Brisbane, Queensland, Australia. In the 2021 census, Norman Park had a population of 6,842 people.

== Geography ==
Norman Park is located 6.3 kilometres (3.9 mi) by road east of the CBD. It borders East Brisbane, Coorparoo, Camp Hill, Morningside and Hawthorne, and is mostly residential.

== Toponymy ==
Norman Park is likely named after an early estate in the area. The estate is thought to have derived its name in the 1890s from the nearby Norman Creek, and the contemporary Governor of Queensland Henry Wylie Norman.

== History ==
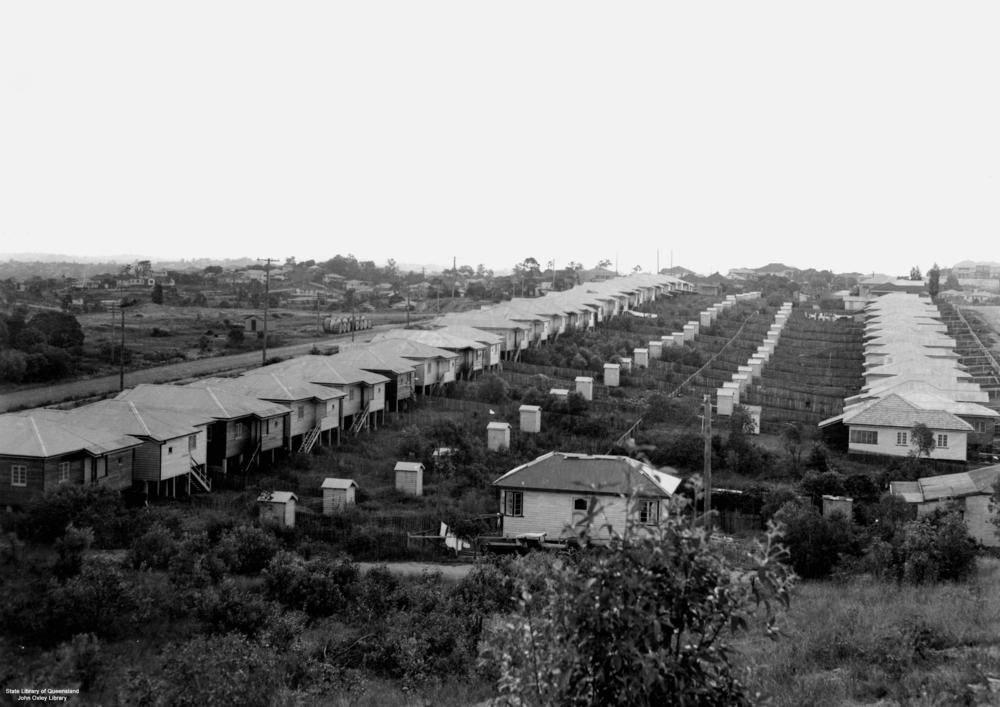
Norman Park, like many areas of Brisbane, was unsewered until the late 1960s, with each house having an outhouse or "dunny" in the back yard.

Norman Park began taking in the first settlers in 1853. One of the early Deeds of Grant was in 1854 to Louis Hope of land totalling about 40 acres. Hope was a grazier and Ormiston Sugar Mill owner.

Initially, development in Norman Park was slow and almost ceased after the 1893 Brisbane floods. Industries in Norman Park at the time included dairying, leather and brooms.

Norman Park State School opened on 9 July 1900 with 52 students with a principal and three teacher.

Between 1912 and 1926, the Belmont Tramway connected with the Queensland Government railway at Norman Park railway station. Initially the service was operated by the Belmont Shire Council. The service was suspended in 1924. The service was reinstated by the Brisbane City Council in 1925, but was again suspended in 1926. In 2006 remnants of the tramway's right of way could still be seen close to the railway station.

A major subdivision of 364 housing lots occurred in 1922 of the land formally owned by Louis Hope, however Norman Park remained a largely rural area until after World War II, when rapid development took place as the result of the construction of public housing.

In the 1940s and 1950s, extensive reclamation of land in the low-lying areas created parks and playing fields.

On 13 July 1924, Archbishop Gerald Sharp laid the foundation stone for the new brick Anglican Church of the Transfiguration at 40 Agnew Street to replace an earlier timber church. On 26 October 1924 Archbishop Sharp officially opened the church, dedicating it as a World War I memorial. Its final service was held on 25 February 2010. As the church was heritage listed, it could not be demolished so it was sold for $2.4M and redeveloped with an extension as a private home.

Our Lady of the Assumption Catholic Church opened on 1927 in a converted house. It was on the south-west corner of Railway Parade and Agnew Street (27.4762°S 153.0652°E). It closed in 1979.

The Baptist Sunday school and hall in Norman Park were officially opened on Saturday 4 April 1936 by Reverend George Haughan (President of the Queensland Baptist Union). The buildings were built at the rear of the block of land to allow a church to be built at the front at a later time. It was an initiative of the younger members of the Jireh Baptist Church in Fortitude Valley.

Our Lady of the Assumption Primary School opened on 3 February 1948 and closed on 9 December 1973.

Norman Park Uniting Christian School opened in 1981 and closed in 1983. It was at the Uniting Church at 177 Bennetts Road (now the Faith Works Uniting Church, 27.48388°S 153.06443°E).

The Agnew School opened in Agnew Street on 3 February 2003. In 2008, the school relocated to Wakerley and, as at 2020, is known as the Brisbane campus of OneSchool Global. It is associated with the Plymouth Brethren Christian Church.

== Demographics ==
In the 2011 census, Norman Park had a population of 6,003 people, of whom 50.7% were female and 49.3% were male. The median age of the population was 33; four years younger than the Australian median. 77.2% of people living in Norman Park were born in Australia, compared to the national average of 69.8%. The other most common countries of birth were England (3.8%), New Zealand (3.4%), South Africa (0.8%), Germany (0.7%), and Ireland (0.7%). 87.4% of people only spoke English at home, while the next most commonly spoken languages were Greek (0.8%), German (0.6%), French (0.5%), Italian (0.5%), and Japanese (0.4%).

In the 2016 census, Norman Park had a population of 6,287 people.

In the 2021 census, Norman Park had a population of 6,842 people.

== Heritage listings ==
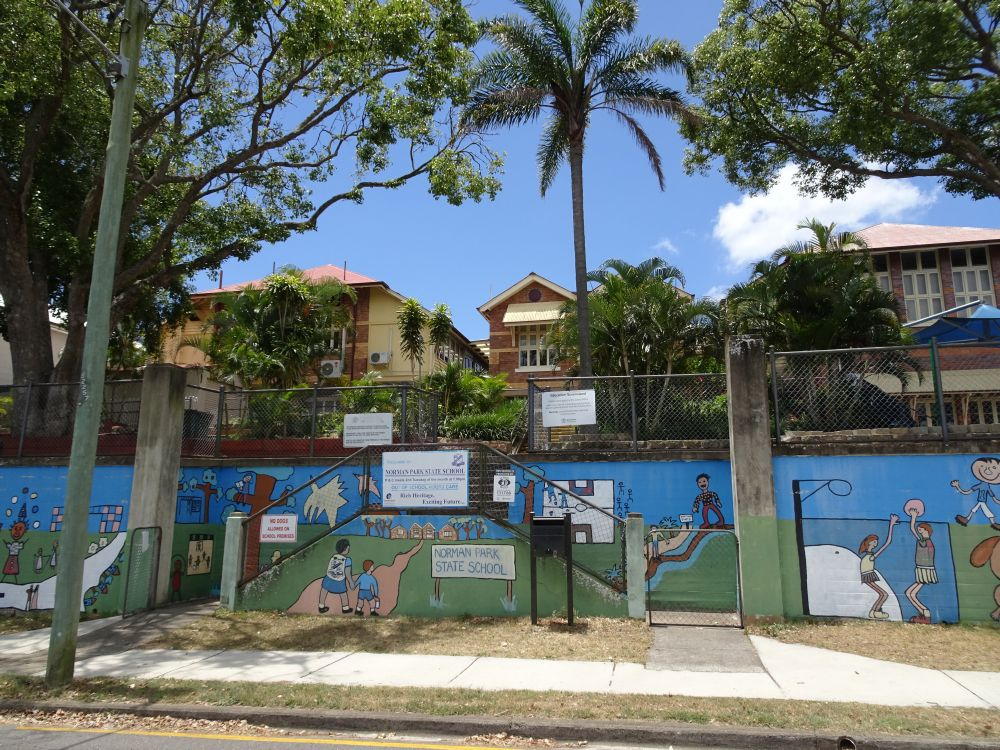
Norman Park State School, view from Agnew Street, 2016

Norman Park has a number of heritage-listed sites, including:

- Norman Park State School, 68–88 Agnew Street (27.4744°S 153.0628°E)
- Norman Park railway station, 3 Corrie Street (27.48172°S 153.06239°E)
- Eulalia (house), 75 McIllwraith Avenue (27.4852°S 153.0682°E)
- MacPherson's Outlook, 20 Waldo Street (27.4721°S 153.0573°E)
- former Brisbane City Council Tramways Substation No 9, 97 Wynnum Road (27.4749°S 153.0551°E)

== Education ==
Norman Park State School is a government primary (Prep–6) school for boys and girls at 68–88 Agnew Street (27.4745°S 153.0623°E). In 2017, the school had an enrolment of 457 students with 36 teachers (29 full-time equivalent) and 16 non-teaching staff (11 full-time equivalent). In 2023, the school had an enrolment of 413 students with 32 teachers (27 full-time equivalent) and 21 non-teaching staff (13 full-time equivalent).

Coorparoo State School in Coorparoo and Seven Hills State School in Seven Hills also enrol students from the southern part of Norman Park.

There are no secondary schools in Norman Park. The nearest government secondary school is Coorparoo Secondary College in Coorparoo.

== Public transport ==
The Cleveland railway line passes through the suburb, with Norman Park station located centrally.

Norman Park Ferry Terminal is located off Wynnum Road in the suburb's north. The cross-river ferry service was ended in 2020 by the Brisbane City Council due to low passenger numbers.

== Notable people ==
- Kevin Rudd, former Australian prime minister, owned a property in Norman Crescent, Norman Park while he was in office. He has since sold it.

== See also ==
- List of tramways in Queensland
