= Robert Adams =

Robert, Bob or Bobby Adams may refer to:

== Arts and entertainment ==
- Bob Adams (1874–1948), one half of American vaudeville duo The Two Bobs
- Robert Adams (actor) (1906–1965), British Guyanese actor
- Robert Adams (sculptor) (1917–1983), British sculptor and designer
- Robert Adams (science fiction writer) (1933–1990), American science fiction and fantasy writer, best known for his Horseclans series
- Robert Adams (photographer) (born 1937), American photographer
- Rob Adams (actor) (Robert Lee Adams II, born 1970), American actor
- Robert 'Shellsuit Bob' Adams, fictional character in BBC Scotland's River City

== Sportsmen ==
- Bob Adams (1920s pitcher) (1901–1996), American League baseball pitcher
- Bob Adams (1930s pitcher) (1907–1970), National League baseball pitcher
- Bob Adams (footballer) (1917–1970), English footballer who played in the Football League for Bristol Rovers, Cardiff City and Millwall
- Bobby Adams (1921–1997), Major League Baseball infielder
- Bob Adams (decathlete) (1924–2019), Canadian decathlete
- Robert Adams (rower) (born 1942), Canadian rower
- Bob Adams (American football) (born 1946), American football tight end for several National Football League teams
- Robert Adams (Australian footballer) (born 1949), Australian rules footballer
- Bob Adams (first baseman) (born 1952), Major League Baseball utility player

== Politicians ==
- Robert H. Adams (1792–1830), US senator from Mississippi, 1830
- Robert Patten Adams (1831–1911), puisne judge and politician in Tasmania, Australia
- Robert Adams Jr. (1849–1906), member of the US House of Representatives from Pennsylvania, 1893–1906
- Robert Adams VI (1963–2019), lobbyist, political campaign manager and strategist
- Robert Stanley Adams (1895–1943), member of the Florida State Senate
- Robert Watkins Adams (1839–1886), member of the Florida State Senate

== Others ==
- Robert Adams (architect) (1540–1595), English architect
- Robert Adams (sailor) (1790–?), American sailor and explorer
- Robert Adams (physician) (1791–1875), Irish physician
- Robert Adams (handgun designer) (1810–1880), British designer and manufacturer of firearms
- Robert Dudley Adams (1829–1912), businessman in colonial Australia, and littérateur
- Robert Adams II (1832–1882), cotton planter and officer in the army of the Confederate States of America
- Sir Robert Adams (Indian Army officer) (1856–1928), British general and 1897 recipient of the Victoria Cross
- Robert M. Adams (literary scholar) (1915–1996), American literary scholar
- Robert McCormick Adams Jr. (1926–2018), American anthropologist
- Robert Adams (spiritual teacher) (1928–1997), American teacher of Advaita Vedanta (Non-dualism)
- Robert Merrihew Adams (1937–2024), American philosopher
- Rob Adams (architect) (born 1948), director of City Design, City of Melbourne, Australia
- Bob Adams (road manager) (fl. 1960s–1981), British road manager
- Bob Adams (engineer) (fl. 1977–2018), American electrical engineer
- Robert N. Adams (1835–1914), American brevet brigadier general during the American Civil War

== See also ==
- Bert Adams (disambiguation)
- Robert Adam (disambiguation)
- Adams (surname)
