= Brisbane Open House =

- Genre: Open day
- Frequency: Annual
- Locations: Brisbane, Queensland
- Inaugurated: 2 October 2010
- Next event: 2025
- Participants: 50-120 buildings
- Attendance: 25,000-33,000
- Website: brisbaneopenhouse.com.au

Brisbane Open House (BOH) is a free annual event which allows the public to discover the architecture, engineering and history in buildings and places in Brisbane, Queensland, Australia. Selected buildings are open to the public with guided and self-guided tours encouraging visitors to explore Brisbane's built environment.

The event is organised by the Queensland Government Architect, the Brisbane Development Association, and the National Trust of Queensland. It is supported by the Brisbane City Council and a range of program and practice partners and friends of Brisbane Open House.

Brisbane Open House is part of the Open House Worldwide annual cultural event.

== History ==
The inaugural Brisbane Open House took place on 2 October 2010, and featured 20 buildings in the CBD and South Bank. More than 12,000 people attended. In 2011 the event expanded to 30 buildings and included Fortitude Valley. The 2012 event featured 51 buildings and attracted 33,000 visitors. The 2013 event expanded to 71 buildings presented over a two-day weekend. The 2014 event featured 89 buildings.

=== 2015 ===
New buildings open to the general public for the first time were:

- Archerfield Airport
- Brisbane GPO
- Princess Theatre
- Queensland Emergency Operations Centre

=== 2016 ===
The 2016 event expanded to 100 buildings with large number of new buildings open to the general public for the first time:

- 480 Queen Street
- Brisbane Arts Theatre
- Fort Lytton Historic Military Precinct
- Moreton Club
- Queensland State Archives
- Sir Thomas Brisbane Planetarium
- Wacol Military Museum
- Wolston House

=== 2019 ===
In 2019, the tenth anniversary, BOH attracted 80,000 visits across 119 sites.

=== 2020-21 ===
In 2020 and 2021 the impact of the COVID-19 pandemic meant the planned 2020 and 2021 events had to be cancelled. Instead, Brisbane Open House created year-round offerings for smaller groups of participants.

=== 2022 ===
In 2022, Brisbane Open House partnered with Aria Property Group to celebrate the Fish Lane Arts Precinct by offering guided walking tours.

=== 2024 ===
For the 2024 event, BOH once agained open a range of buildings and spaces to the public, with a geo-focused program across the Brisbane CBD and New Farm, as well as the introduction of an inaugural Speaker Series.

=== Villages of Brisbane (VOB) ===
The inaugural VOB celebrated Sandgate and Shorncliffe where many local buildings and places were open to the public with a speaker series in the Sandgate Town Hall, as well as a number of walking tours. In 2023, the Iconic Precinct showcased the heritage gems and state-of-the-art medical labs of Herston. In 2024, the inner-city suburb of New Farm was celebrated as the Village of Brisbane.

== Participating buildings ==
Building	2010	2011	2012	2013	2014	2015	2016	2017	2018	2019
480 Queen Street							x	x	x	
4ZZZ								x	x	x
ABC Brisbane Centre				x	x	x	x	x	x	x
All Saints Anglican Church			x	x	x	x	x	x	x	x
Archerfield Airport						x	x	x	x	
Boggo Road Gaol				x	x			x	x	
Brisbane City Hall		x	x	x	x	x	x	x	x	x
Brisbane General Post Office						x				
Brisbane Polo Club – Naldham House				x	x					
Brisbane Powerhouse						x			x	x
Brisbane Square	x	x	x	x	x	x	x			
Commissariat Store	x	x	x	x	x	x	x	x	x	x
Customs House	x	x	x	x	x	x	x			
Ecosciences Precinct				x	x	x	x		x	x
Fernberg, Government House						x	x	x	x	x
Fort Lytton Historic Military Precinct							x	x	x	x
Gabba Stadium					x	x				
Griffith Film School				x	x	x	x	x	x	x
HASSELL Studio Warry St		x	x	x		x				
Howard Smith Wharves				x	x	x	x	x		x
Kurilpa Bridge	x		x	x						
Lady Cilento Children's Hospital					x					
MacArthur Museum		x	x	x	x	x	x	x	x	x
Masonic Memorial Temple	x	x	x	x	x	x	x	x		x
Mercy Heritage Centre, 547 Ann Street		x	x	x	x					
Miegunyah House Museum					x	x	x	x	x	x
National Australia Bank, 308 Queen Street	x	x	x	x	x	x	x			
National Trust House, 95 William St		x	x		x		x			
Naval Offices, Edward St					x		x			
Newstead House				x	x	x	x	x	x	x
Old Bishopsbourne and Old Bishopsbourne Chapel						x	x	x	x	x
Old Government House	x	x	x	x	x	x	x	x	x	x
Old Museum Brisbane				x	x	x				
One One One Eagle Street			x	x	x					
Oral Health Centre, University of Queensland						x	x	x		
Parliament House	x	x	x	x		x	x	x	x	x
Port of Brisbane					x	x	x	x	x	x
Princess Theatre, 8 Annerley Road, Woolloongabba						x	x			
QIMR Berghofer Medical Research Institute				x	x	x	x		x	
Queen Elizabeth II Courts of Law			x	x	x				x	x
Queensland Art Gallery						x	x			
Queensland Conservatorium Griffith University			x			x	x			
Queensland Emergency Operations Centre						x				
Queensland Gallery of Modern Art	x		x				x	x	x	x
Queensland Herbarium						x	x	x	x	x
Queensland Maritime Museum		x	x	x	x	x	x	x	x	x
Queensland Museum & Sciencentre		x	x	x	x	x				x
Queensland Performing Arts Centre	x	x	x	x	x	x	x		x	x
Queensland Tennis Centre					x					
QUT Science and Engineering Centre, Gardens Point campus				x	x	x				
Riverside Centre			x	x	x					
Roma Street Fire Station, 279 Upper Roma Street			x	x	x	x	x	x	x	x
Roma Street Station Heritage Building						x			x	
Santos Place	x	x	x	x						
Spring Hill Service Reservoirs			x		x	x	x	x		x
Spring Hill Baths				x	x				x	x
St Andrew's Uniting Church	x	x	x	x	x	x	x	x	x	x
St John's Cathedral	x	x	x	x	x	x	x	x	x	x
St Stephen's Cathedral				x	x	x	x		x	x
State Library of Queensland	x	x	x	x	x	x	x	x	x	x
Tara House – Irish Club, 175 Elizabeth St			x	x	x					
Tattersalls Club, 215 Queen St	x	x	x	x	x	x	x			x
The Old Windmill			x	x	x	x	x	x	x	x
Translational Research Institute, 37 Kent Street, Wooloongabba				x	x	x	x	x	x	x
Treasury Heritage Hotel	x	x	x	x	x	x	x	x	x	x
Victoria Barracks			x		x					
Wacol Military Museum							x	x	x	x
Walter Taylor Bridge					x	x	x	x	x	x
XXXX Brewery					x					

== See also ==
- Doors Open Days
- Open House Melbourne
