= Rob Adams =

Rob Adams may refer to:

- Rob Adams (actor) (born 1970), American actor, film acting coach and former college football quarterback
- Rob Adams (architect) (born 1948), Australian architect and urban designer

== See also ==
- Robert Adams (disambiguation)
