= Norwest Business Park =

Business park in Sydney, Australia

Coordinates: 33°44′0″S 150°57′49″E

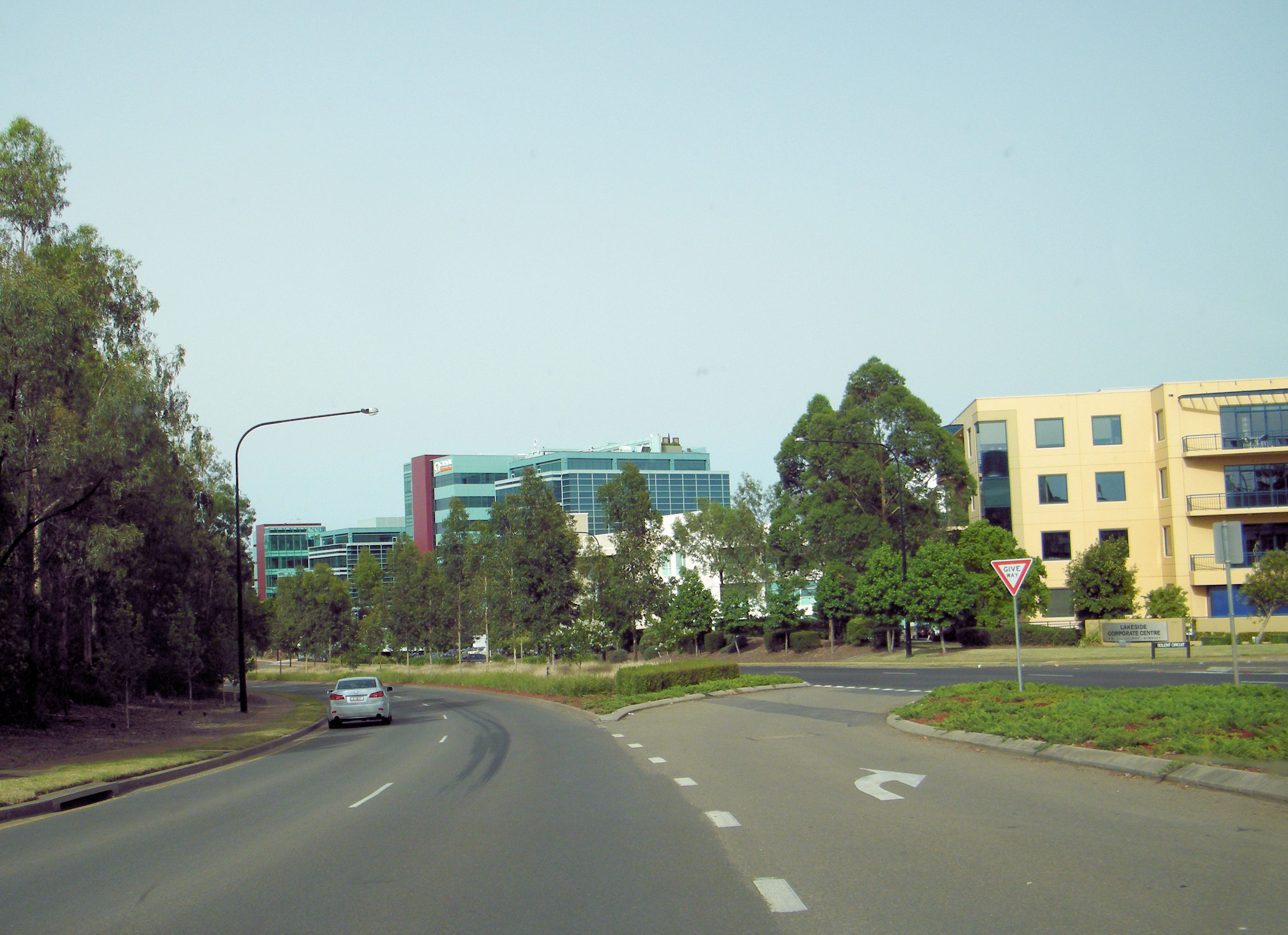
- Office buildings along Norwest Boulevard, the park's main arterial road
- Development Type: Business Park
- Location: Norwest, Bella Vista
- Tenant's Operations: Corporate headquarters Regional Offices; Research and Development; Retail; Health Care
- Tenants: Headquarters: Hillsong Church; Woolworths; Regional Offices: Reserve Bank of Australia; ResMed; Wyeth; Optus Data Centre; HWL Ebsworth
- Size: 1,700,000 m^{2} (18,000,000 sq ft)
- Developer: Douglas Lanceley of Norbrik Brick & Tile co.
- Owner: Buildings owned by trust, and investment, open space owned by Council
- Website: Norwest Business Park
- Established: 1983; 43 years ago

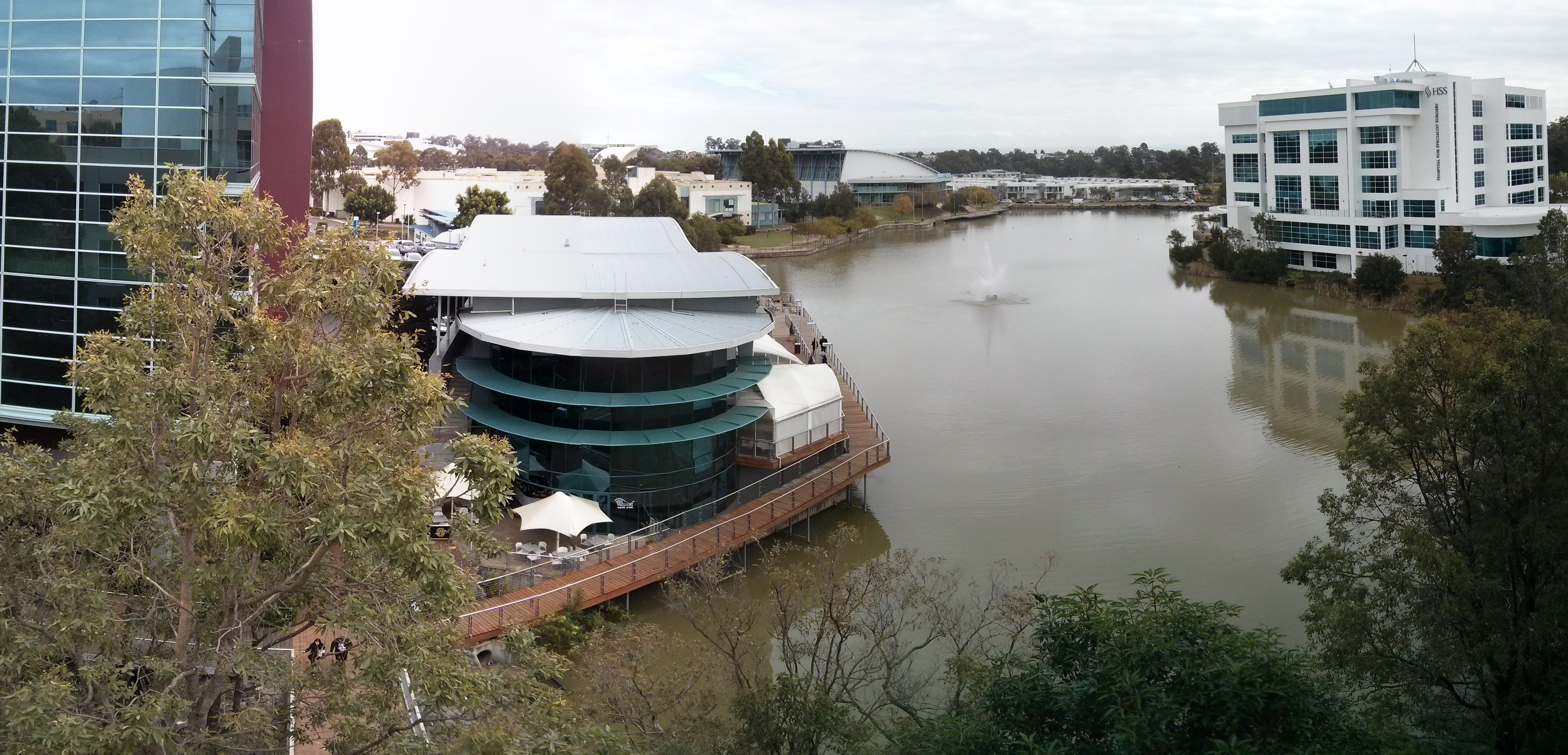
Norwest Lake, Norwest Business Park

The Norwest Business Park is a business park in the suburbs of Norwest and Bella Vista in the local government area of The Hills Shire in Sydney, New South Wales, Australia. Norwest Business Park is bordered by Windsor Road to the east, and Old Windsor Road to the west, with Norwest Boulevard stretching the length of the park between the two main arterial roads. Over 400 companies are located in the park, employing more than 25,000 people. The complex consists of a mix of commercial, professional and health-care services provided to the population of Sydney's Hills District.

The business park has as tenants two shopping centres, hotels and serviced apartments, two service stations, gyms, alternative health services, medical centres, professional services, banks, child care centres, business hub post office, waterways and landscaped public open spaces. Projected employment is 32,000 by 2031. The park is 172 hectares in area and currently has 800 businesses. Occupied space is currently 500,000m² with potential for a total of 1.7 million m².

== History ==
The park was established in 1983, during the Sydney housing boom. Farms had previously occupied the area. The park grew with the expanding population of the area, and the first business to be constructed was the Baulkham Hills Coles supermarket, known as Norwest Markettown.

In 1993, Cathay Pacific paid $5.2M for land in Norwest business park to establish a $260 million international data centre. This solidified the park as a serious business hub and represented 16 per cent of the first stage of Norwest Business Park development.

The expansion of the Hillsong Church in the area saw a corresponding expansion in the businesses of the area. In 2005, the Woolworths head office was constructed, and now employs several thousand staff. Cafes and restaurants also serve the park.

Other large-scale corporations in the Norwest Business Park include Vertiv, ResMed, AAMI Insurance, Fitness First gym, and one of the Reserve Bank of Australia's data centres.

Subaru Australia has an office in Baulkham Hills part of this business area.

Norwest also houses Australia's largest law firm (by partner numbers), HWL Ebsworth.

The park was conceived and developed by Douglas Boyd Lanceley. (CEO of Norbrik) on land that was purchased by North Sydney Brick & Tile Company (Norbrik)in 1949 - a Brickwork Company.

== Transport ==
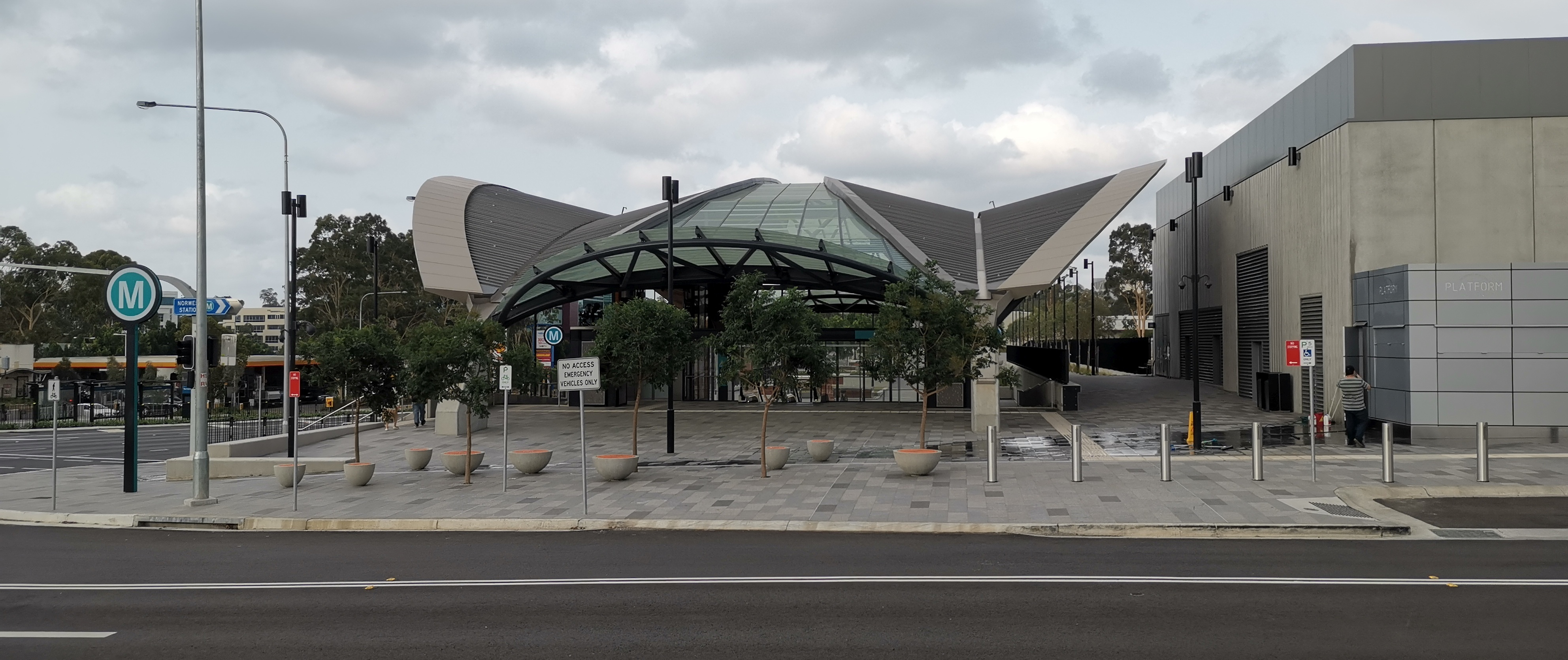
Norwest Metro Station Dec 2019, Southern side (Brookhollow Ave) entry/exit

Transport to the business park is possible by car, metro, bus or by cycling on the off-road Windsor Road or M7 cycleways. In May 2019, the Metro North West Line opened with a Bella Vista railway station servicing the western end of Norwest and Norwest railway station adjacent to Norwest Marketplace shopping centre and Hillsong Church. Before that, in late 2005, the Westlink M7 Motorway opened up with an exit at the western end of Norwest Boulevard; this gave the business park greater exposure for businesses in Southern and Western Sydney with motorway exits at the M5 at Prestons and the M4 at Eastern Creek respectively. The M2 Hills Motorway (which connects with the M7 near Old Windsor Road) also provides travel connections to the Sydney CBD and Sydney Airport. However the increase of traffic flow from the motorways brought traffic congestion. Norwest Boulevard, Windsor and Old Windsor Roads often suffer traffic jams during morning and afternoon peak times.

=== North-West T-Way ===
In late March 2007, the North West T-Way opened, providing relief to the traffic congested business park. The T-Way runs from Parramatta to Rouse Hill. The T-Way provides frequent bus services between Parramatta and Rouse Hill, promoting the use of public transport in and around Sydney. The route runs primarily along Old Windsor Road with several stops. Three T-way bus stations serve Norwest Business Park; Norbrik (near the corner of Old Windsor Road and Norbrik Drive), Meurants (near the corner of Old Windsor Road and Norwest Boulevard and Celebration (near the corner of Old Windsor Road and Celebration Drive). CDC NSW route T64 between Parramatta and Rouse Hill travels through the business park seven days a week. CDC NSW also operate route 618 from the Sydney central business district via Lane Cove and route 628 from Macquarie Park via the M2, Windsor Road through Norwest Boulevard to Lexington Drive. Busways operate Route T70 through Norwest Business Park, linking with Castle Hill and Blacktown.

The North West T-Way also runs from Blacktown to Rouse Hill, running along Sunnyholt Road before joining the Parramatta - Rouse Hill T-Way at Burns Road.

The EIS for the construction of two underground railway stations for North West Rail was released in April 2012 with construction expected to start in 2014. Construction of the rail link commenced in 2014, with two railway stations being built in the Norwest Business Park area - Bella Vista Station and Norwest Station. The North West Rail Link was scheduled to open to the public in the first half of 2019, and opened on the 26th of May 2019.

== Services ==
- Norwest Private Hospital
- Woolworths
