= HWL Ebsworth =

Australian law firm

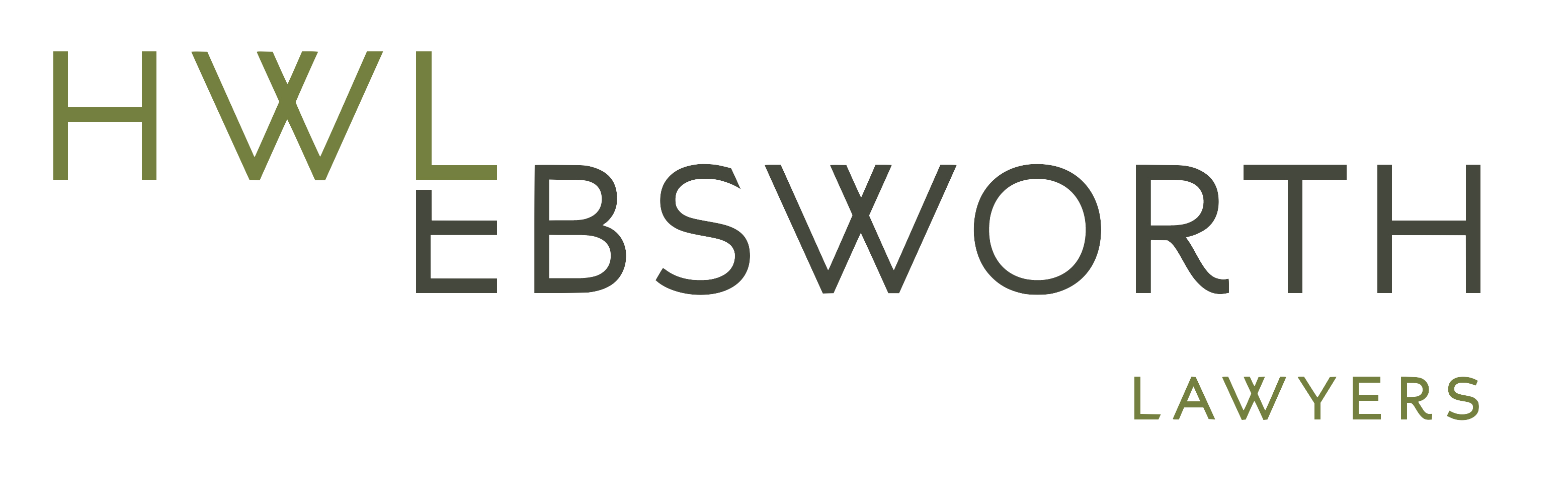
- Headquarters: Melbourne, Australia
- No. of offices: 9
- No. of lawyers: 850+, including 280+ partners
- No. of employees: 1,250+
- Major practice areas: Full service commercial law firm
- Key people: Kris Hopkins (CEO); Russell Mailler (Chief Executive Partner)
- Revenue: ▲AUD$449.6 million (2024)
- Date founded: 1890s
- Company type: Partnership
- Website: www.hwlebsworth.com.au

HWL Ebsworth (HWLE Lawyers or HWLE) is a commercial law firm that operates throughout Australia. It is the largest partnership among Australian law firms, with 280 partners.

HWL Ebsworth operates offices in Adelaide, Brisbane, Canberra, Darwin, Hobart, Melbourne, Norwest, Perth and Sydney. It trades in the areas of Banking & Financial Services, Building & Construction, Corporate & Commercial, Insurance, Litigation & Dispute Resolution, Planning & Environment, Government, Real Estate & Projects, Transport and Workplace Relations & Safety.

== History ==
HWL Ebsworth traces its foundation back to the 1890s. Throughout the second half of the 20th century, the firm was known as Ebsworth and Ebsworth prior to merging with Home Wilkinson Lowry in 2008.

In 2011 HWL Ebsworth opened its new office in Canberra, one of the largest law offices located in the Australian Capital Territory. In 2013 the firm expanded into Western Australia by merging with Downings Legal. In 2014 HWL Ebsworth merged with Adelaide commercial law firm Kelly & Co and established an office in Adelaide.

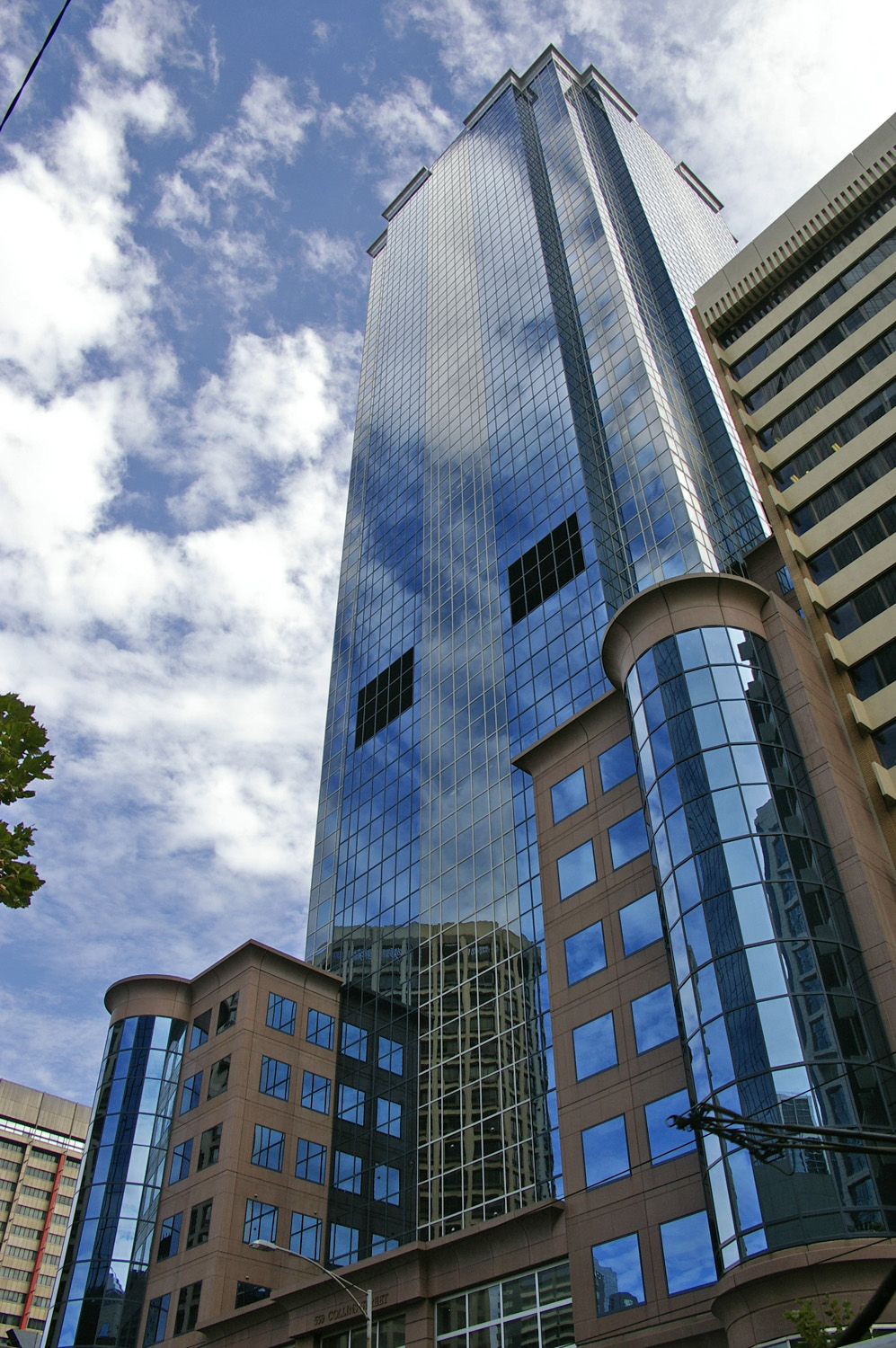
530 Collins Street Tower, HWL Ebsworth's head office in Melbourne

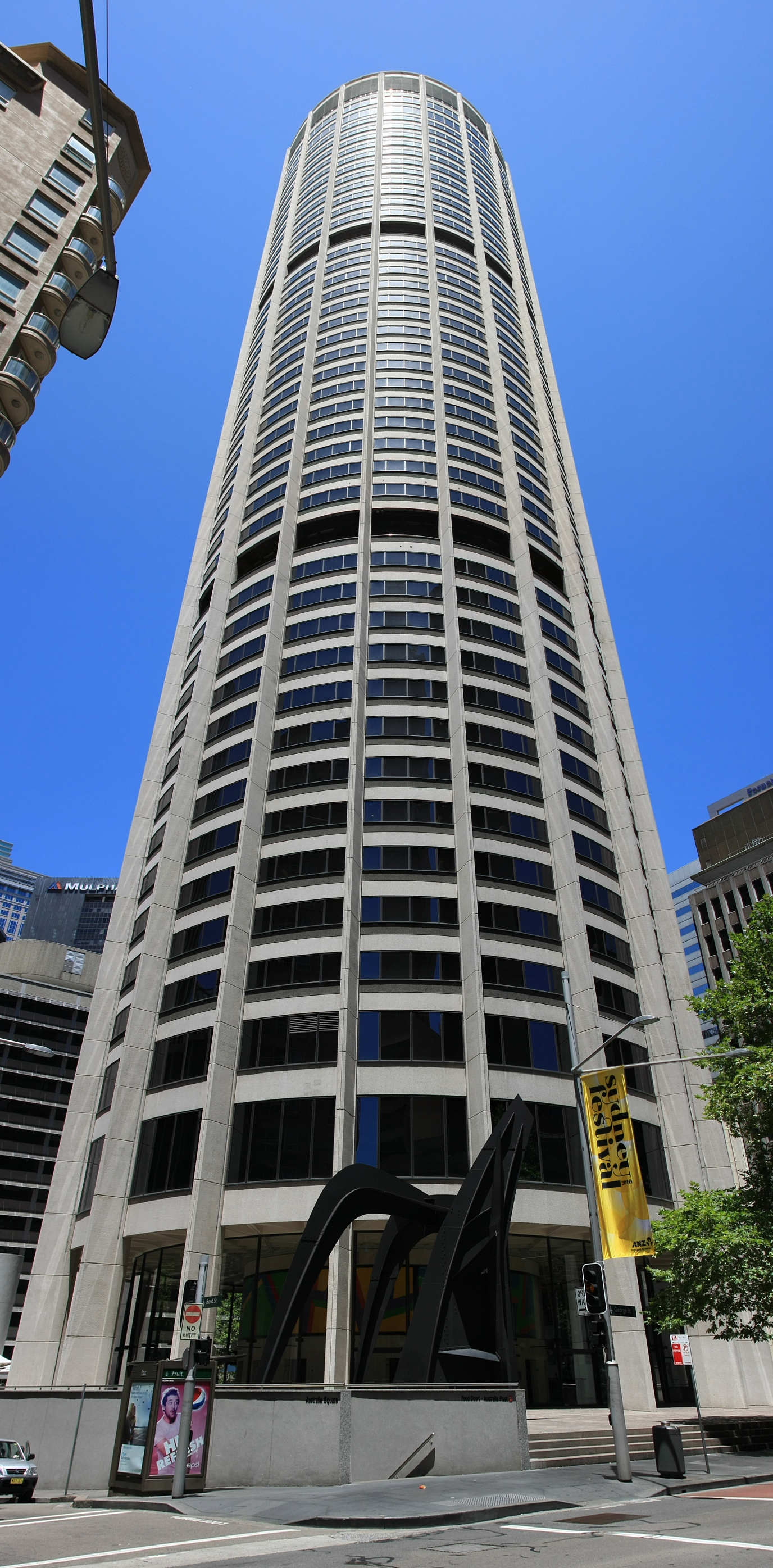
Australia Square, HWL Ebsworth's Sydney office

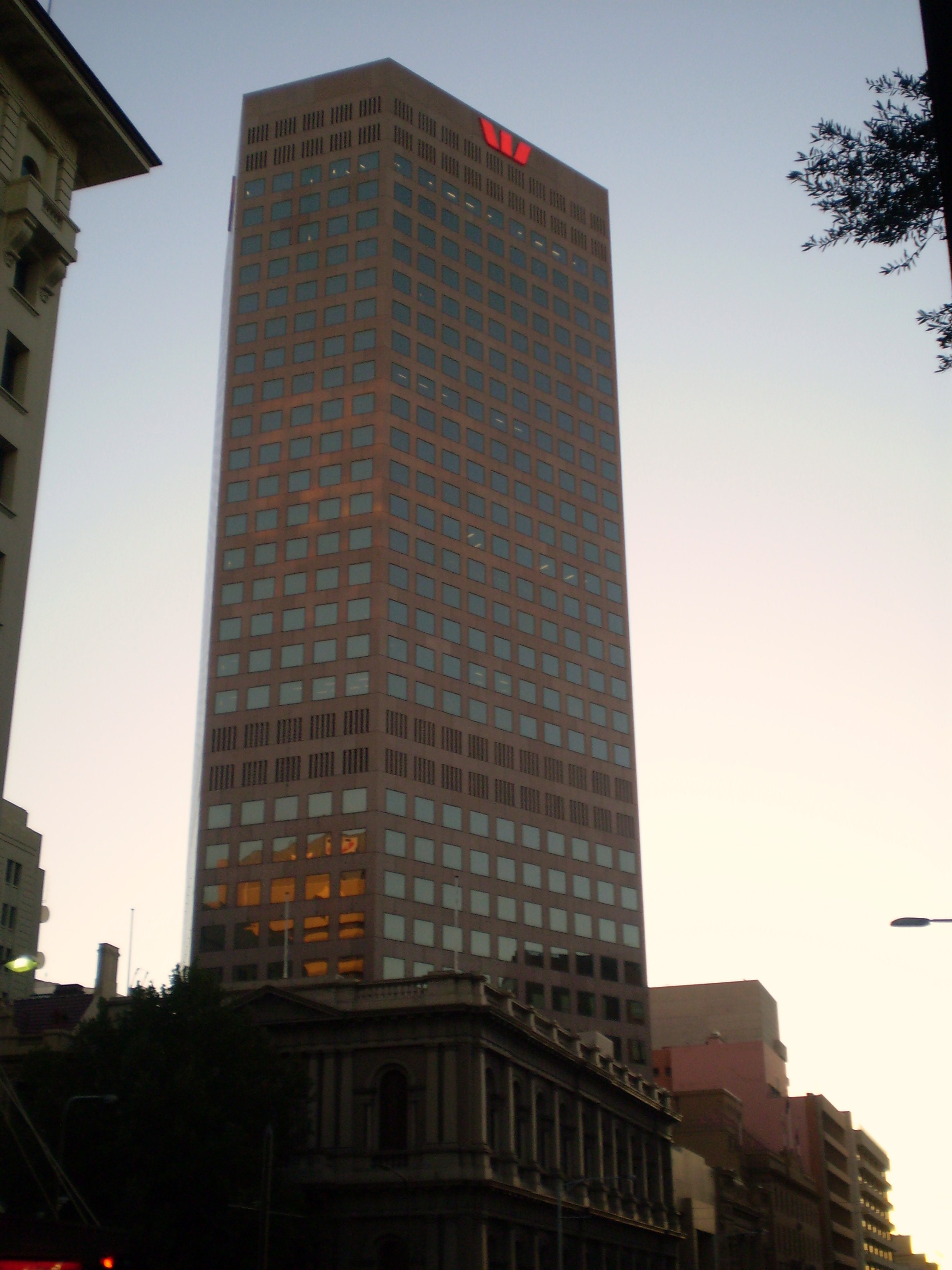
RAA Place, HWL Ebsworth's Adelaide office

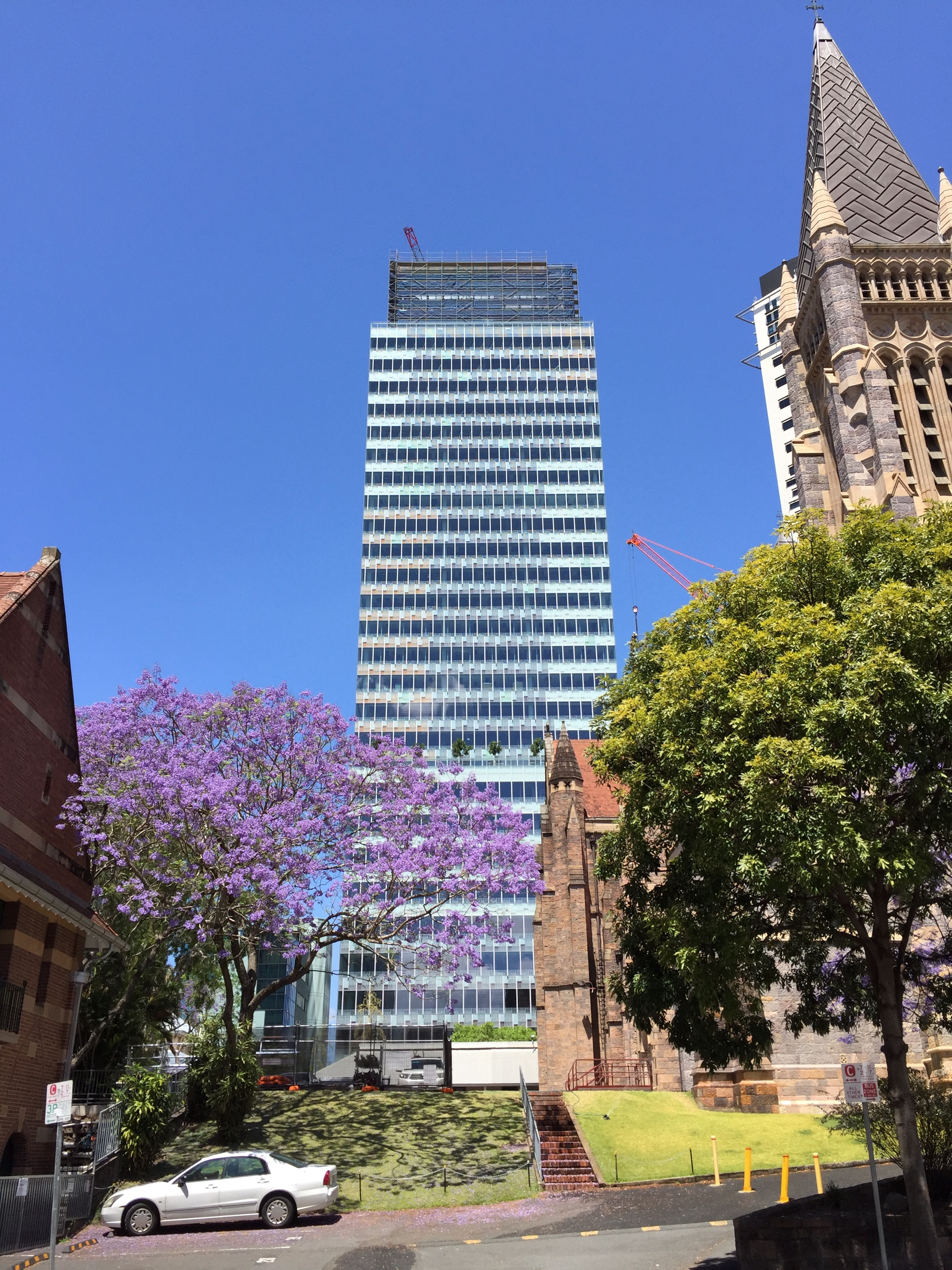
480 Queen Street, HWL Ebsworth's Brisbane office

In December 2014, HWL Ebsworth announced that it had acquired two additional Australian law firms based in the Northern Territory and South Australia.

In August 2016, HWL Ebsworth opened a Tasmanian office, making it the only commercial law firm to have offices in every state and territory of Australia.

In February 2018, HWL Ebsworth acquired mid-tier firm TressCox Lawyers, founded in 1897, bringing the partner count to approximately 230 plus another 900 legal and support staff.

On 18 March 2024, Managing Partner Juan Martinez died aged 64 from a suspected heart attack. Martinez took over in 1998, growing the firm from 40 partners to 285. The firm’s chairman, Ross Williams, assumed the role of acting managing partner.

== Cyberincident 2023 ==
In May 2023, reports began emerging that HWL Ebsworth had been hacked, with claims that four terabytes of data had been illegally accessed and copied by culprits in Russia. In mid-June the figure of four terabytes was revised and reduced to 3.6 terabytes, and a figure of 2.37 million files was reported. This included files relating to about 45 federal or state government departments and about 50 ASX 100 corporations. HWLE refused to pay a ransom of $7 million. In June 2023, the company successfully sought an injunction from the Supreme Court of New South Wales to prevent anyone discussing what is in the stolen cache of data. The gag order covered the firm's clients as well as news media.

== Practice areas ==
HWL Ebsworth is a full-service commercial law firm and the firm accordingly participates in all major commercial law practice areas. A substantial amount of the firm's work includes:

- Insurance
- Banking and Financial Services
- Construction
- Capital Markets
- Corporate and Commercial
- Energy and Resources
- Government
- Insolvency
- Intellectual Property
- Litigation and Dispute Resolution
- Transport

== Recognition ==
As of 2020, HWL Ebsworth was ranked by Chambers and Partners as a band 1 Australian firm in aviation, native title and shipping, and by The Legal 500 as a tier 1 Australian firm in aviation.

== Offices ==
- (Victoria (state)) Melbourne (447 Collins Street - Head Office)
- (New South Wales) Sydney (Martin Place)
- (New South Wales) Norwest (Norwest Business Park)
- (Northern Territory) Darwin (Mitchell Centre)
- (Australian Capital Territory) Canberra (HWL Ebsworth Building)
- (Queensland) Brisbane (480 Queen Street)
- (Western Australia) Perth (240 St Georges Terrace)
- (South Australia) Adelaide (RAA Place)
- (Tasmania) Hobart (85 Macquarie Street)

== Notable employees ==
- Sandy Street, a judge of the Federal Circuit Court of Australia, worked as a lawyer at the firm before being called to the Bar.
- Ron McCallum AO, a legal academic and former dean of law at the University of Sydney, became a consultant at HWL Ebsworth in 2010.
- Alan Rose AO, a former public servant, became a consultant at HWL Ebsworth in 2012.
