= Committee for Melbourne =

Australian non-profit organisation

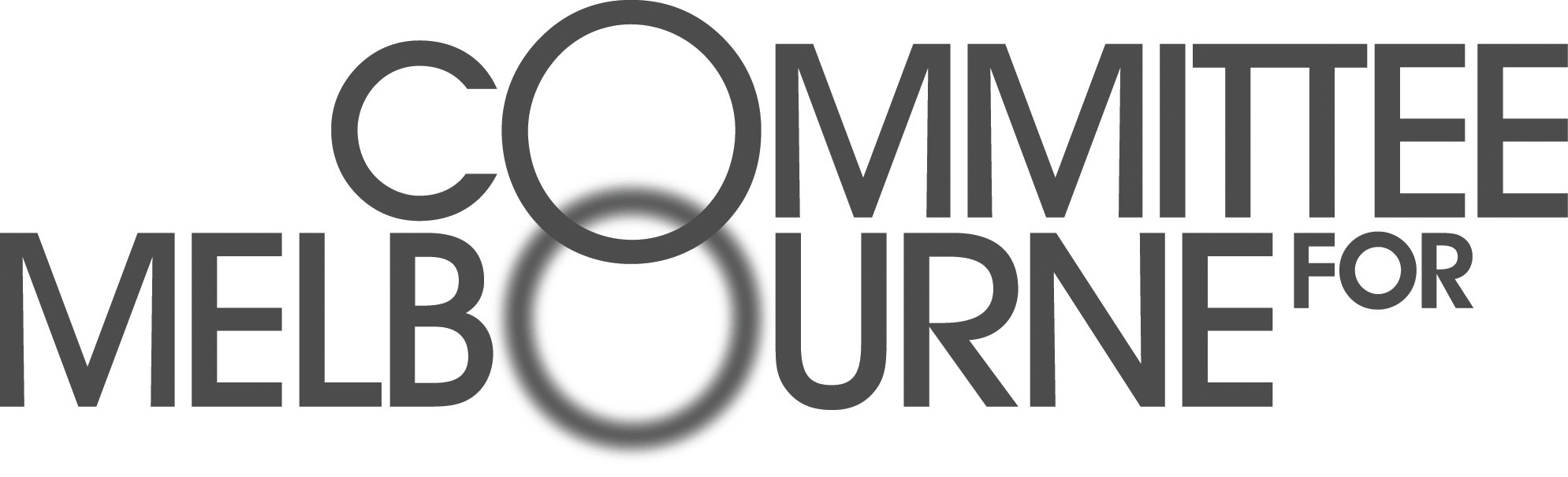
- Company type: Incorporated association
- Founded: 1985
- Headquarters: Melbourne, Victoria, Australia
- Website: melbourne.org.au

The Committee for Melbourne is an apolitical, non-profit, member-based organisation based in Melbourne, Australia, that works to benefit the city's long-term future.

== History ==
The committee was founded in 1985 by Pamela M. Warrender, daughter of Sir Norman Myer and husband of Simon Warrender.

Simon Warrender Jnr founded the Melbourne Prize Trust in 2004, which was an initiative of the Committee for Melbourne.

== Description ==
The Committee for Melbourne is an apolitical member-based organisation that seeks to have a positive impact on the long-term development of Greater Melbourne. It aims to bring together businesses, academia and non-profit organisations for activities, networking, and policy advice to government. Its aim is to keep Melbourne as one of the world's most liveable cities.

== Activities ==
The committee has been involved with a number of major changes to Melbourne, such as the Melbourne Docklands development, and smaller programs such as Melbourne Green Roofs program, Melbourne Open House, Melbourne's Moving Galleries and many others.

The outcomes of the Committee for Melbourne come in three categories: private sector collaboration, establishing organisations, and shaping government policy.

== Melbourne Achiever Award ==
The Committee for Melbourne gives the prestigious Melbourne Achiever awards. Past winners have included:

- Rob Adams
- Ruth Bishop
- Mark Burry
- Graeme Clark (doctor)
- Zelman Cowen
- Adam Elliot
- Barry Humphries
- Cathy Freeman
- Andrea Hull
- David de Kretser
- Jesse Martin
- Melbourne Zoo
- Dame Elisabeth Murdoch
- Christine Nixon
- Oarsome Foursome
- Royal Children's Hospital, Melbourne
- Leo Schofield
- John So
- Ninian Stephen
- Shane Warne
