= Robert Adam (disambiguation) =

Robert Adam (1728–1792) was a British designer.

Robert Adam may also refer to:

- Robert Adam (architect, born 1948), a British classical architect
- Robert Borthwick Adam (1833–1904), American retailer and book collector
- Robert M. Adam (1885–1967), Scottish photographer and botanist
- Robert Adam (died 1952), British captain of the cargo ship Rosita murdered by a gunboat on Fuzhou seaway
- Rob Adam (born 1955), South African scientist
- Robert Adam (fl. 1977–2017), architect with ADAM Architecture
- Róbert Ádám (born 1982), Hungarian weightlifter, competitor in the 2007 World Weightlifting Championships – Men's 56 kg

== See also ==
- Robert Adams (disambiguation)
