= Frank Adams (Florida politician) =

American politician (1861–1940)

Frank Adams (1861 – 1940) was an American politician. He served as a state senator, representing Hamilton County, Florida

His father Robert Watkins Adams also served in the Florida Senate and his son Robert Stanley Adams (died 1943) also became a state senator in Florida.

In 1899, he served as president of the Florida Senate. He served as the president of the Florida state senate for two terms, the first to do so since the enactment of the state constitution.

== See also ==
- List of presidents of the Florida Senate
