= Road manager =

Person in charge of logistics and business dealings for an artist's tour

In the music industry, a road manager is a person who works with small to mid-size tours (in terms of personnel involved, based on the size of the production). Job responsibilities include (but are not limited to):

- advancing show dates
- making travel and hotel arrangements (for all group members)
- hiring backline techs or recommending techs to be hired (depending on authority given by artist management)
- coordinating artist media obligations (normally while on tour, but could be anytime)
- ensuring artist rider requirements are met
- collecting payments due to the artist at showtime (or signing off on amount due to be sent via wire, depending on arrangements made by artist management)
- making vendor payments (or submission of amounts due to vendors to artist management)
- handling personnel issues
- distributing per diem (depending on per diem schedule, approved by artist management)

Road managers can be confused with tour managers. Generally speaking, though, tour managers work with upper-mid to large scale tours and are often granted a much greater degree of authority in tour operations.

== Notable people ==
- Bob Adams, 1960s and 1970s British road manager (retired 1981)
- Ian Stewart, former keyboardist for the Rolling Stones (died 1985)

== See also ==
- Road crew
- Body man
