= Open House Melbourne =

- Genre: Open day
- Frequency: Annual
- Locations: Melbourne, Victoria, Australia
- Inaugurated: July 2008
- Next event: 27–28 July 2024
- Participants: 111 buildings
- Attendance: 130,000 estimated
- Website: openhousemelbourne.org

Open House Melbourne (OHM) is an event held in Melbourne, Victoria, Australia, that showcases many of the city's buildings to the public. This annual event has been held on the last weekend in July since 2008.

Open House Melbourne is also a not-for-profit association that runs the Open House Weekend, as well as an annual program of events.

== History ==
Open House Melbourne is an initiative of the Committee for Melbourne Future Focus Group. The inaugural Open House Melbourne 2008 event saw eight buildings open and more than 30,000 visits across the day. Since then, the event has grown and the 2010 event expanded to 59 buildings, incorporating Docklands in addition to Melbourne's CBD, and attracted almost 65,000 visitors.

In the 2011 event 75 buildings opened their doors and attracted 100,000 visitors.

For its fifth year, the 2012 event featured 100 buildings and attracted 135,000 visitors.

In the 2013 event 111 buildings opened over the weekend and attracted 130,000 visitors.

The 2016 event featured over 100 buildings.

In 2017 Open House Melbourne held the Open House Ballarat Weekend, the first regional program run by Open House Melbourne, in partnership with City of Ballarat and Visit Ballarat. In 2018 and 2019 the organisation also held Open House Bendigo in partnership with The City of Greater Bendigo.

The 2019 event featured over 200 buildings and 45 special events, tours and talks.

== Description ==
Notable contemporary, historic, and sustainable buildings and spaces located in and around the Melbourne City Centre, Carlton, East Melbourne, Southbank, Docklands and the Greater Melbourne area are opened for visitors as part of this initiative. Well-known buildings not usually open to the public are open for free public tours. Among the buildings included are historical landmarks, contemporary buildings, galleries, theatres, sporting grounds, and places of worship.

== Shortlist of participating buildings ==
- Argus Building
- Arts Centre Melbourne
- Australian Tapestry Workshop
- Collingwood Town Hall
- Como House
- Coop's Shot Tower
- Council House 2
- Edgewater Towers
- Federation Square
- Government House
- Hamer Hall
- Hawthorn tram depot
- Hellenic Museum
- Hotel Windsor
- La Trobe's Cottage
- Luna Park
- Malthouse Theatre
- Malvern Town Hall
- Melbourne Athenaeum
- Melbourne Central Shopping Centre
- Melbourne City Baths
- Melbourne Convention and Exhibition Centre
- Melbourne General Cemetery
- Melbourne Observatory
- Melbourne Recital Centre
- Melbourne Town Hall
- Mount Burnett Observatory
- National Gallery of Victoria
- Old Treasury Building, Melbourne
- Palais Theatre
- Parliament House
- Prahran Town Hall
- Prima Tower
- Princes Pier
- Public Record Office Victoria
- RMIT Storey Hall
- RMIT Swanston Academic Building
- Rod Laver Arena
- Royal Children's Hospital, Melbourne
- Shrine of Remembrance
- Sidney Myer Music Bowl
- South Melbourne Town Hall
- St Paul's Cathedral, Melbourne
- State Library of Victoria
- Supreme Court of Victoria
- Rialto Towers
- University of Melbourne
- Victoria Barracks
- Victorian Trades Hall
- Young and Jackson Hotel

== See also ==
- Brisbane Open House
- Doors Open Days
- Heritage Open Days
- Doors Open Canada
- Open House London
- Open House New York
- Open House Chicago
