= Robert Adams (Australian footballer) =

Australian rules footballer

Personal information
- Full name: Robert Adams
- Born: 6 June 1949 (age 77)
- Original team: Geelong West

Playing career^{1}
Years	Club	Games (Goals)
1970 — 1971	Geelong	20 (5)
- ^{1} Playing statistics correct to the end of 1971.

Robert Adams (born 6 June 1949) is a former Australian rules footballer who played for Geelong in the Victorian Football League (now known as the Australian Football League).
