= Robert Adams (spiritual teacher) =

American promoter of Advaita (1928–1997)

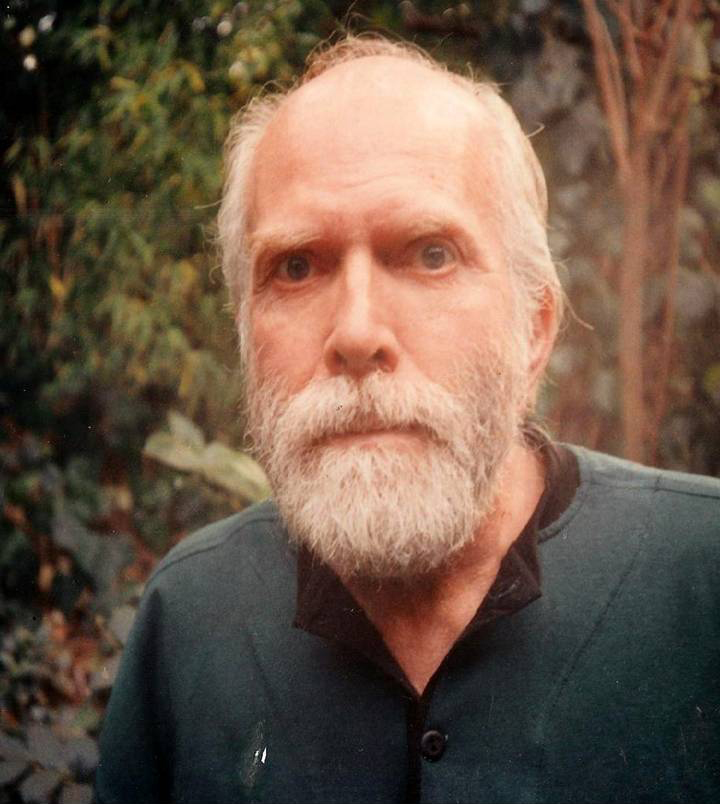
- Robert Adams in the early 1990s

Personal life
- Born: January 21, 1928 New York City, US
- Died: March 2, 1997 (aged 69) Sedona, Arizona, US
- Notable work: Silence of the Heart: Dialogues with Robert Adams

Religious life
- Religion: Hinduism
- Philosophy: Advaita Vedanta

Religious career
- Teacher: Bhagavan Sri Ramana Maharshi

Robert Adams (January 21, 1928–March 2, 1997) was an American Advaita teacher. In later life, Adams held satsang with a small group of devotees in California, USA. He mainly advocated the path of jñāna yoga (Note: Jñāna means 'knowledge' in Sanskrit. The pronunciation can be approximated to 'gyaan yoga'.) with an emphasis on the practice of self-enquiry.

Adams' teachings were not well known in his lifetime but have since been widely circulated amongst those investigating the philosophy of Advaita and the Western devotees of Bhagavan Sri Ramana Maharshi. (Note: Bhagavan means God, Sri is an honorific title, Ramana is a short form of Venkataraman, and Maharshi means 'great seer' in Sanskrit.) A book of his teachings, Silence of the Heart: Dialogues with Robert Adams, was published in 1999.

A number of his statements about the ashram of his guru Ramana Maharshi and about their interaction have raised controversy as to their accuracy.

== Biography ==
=== Early life ===
Robert Adams was born on January 21, 1928, in Manhattan and grew up in New York City. Adams claimed that from as far back as he could remember, he had visions of a two-foot-tall, white-haired, bearded man seated at the foot of his bed who used to talk to him in a language that he did not understand. He told his parents, who thought that he was making it up. He would later find out that thiselt that man was a vision of his future guru, Sri Ramana Maharshi. At the age of seven, Adams' father died and the visitations suddenly stopped.

Adams said that he then developed a siddhi whereby whenever he wanted something, from a candy bar to a violin, all he needed to do was say the name of the object three times and the desired object would appear from somewhere or be given to him by someone. If there was a test at school, Adams would simply say, "God, God, God." and the answers would immediately come to him without prior study.

=== Awakening ===
Adams claimed to have had a profound spiritual awakening at the age of 14 during his end-of-term final math test for which he had not studied. As was his custom, he said "God" three times, but this time there was a phenomenal and unintended outcome:

Instead of the answers coming, the room filled with light, a thousand times more brilliant than the sun. It was like an atomic bomb, but it was not a burning light. It was a beautiful, bright, shining, warm glow. Just thinking of it now makes me stop and wonder. The whole room, everybody, everything was immersed in light. All the children seemed to be myriads particles of light. I found myself melting into radiant being, into consciousness. I merged into consciousness. It was not an out of body experience. This was completely different. I realised that I was not my body. What appeared to be my body was not real. I went beyond the light into pure radiant consciousness. I became omnipresent. My individuality had merged into pure absolute bliss. I expanded. I became the universe. The feeling is indescribable. It was total bliss, total joy. The next thing I remembered was the teacher shaking me. All the students had gone. I was the only one left in the class. I returned to human consciousness. That feeling has never left me.

Not long after this experience, Adams went to the school library to do a book report. While passing through the philosophy section he came across a book on yoga masters. Having no prior knowledge on yoga, he opened the book, and for the first time saw a photo of the man he had experienced visions of as a young child: Bhagavan Sri Ramana Maharshi.

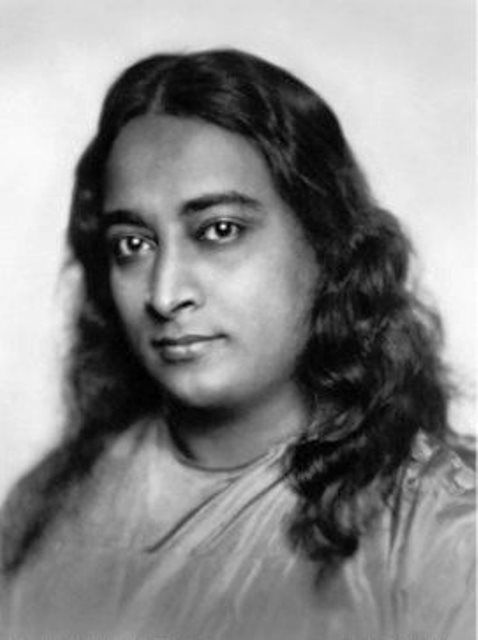
Paramahansa Yogananda

=== Journey to the Guru ===
At the age of 16, Adams' first spiritual mentor was Joel S. Goldsmith, a Christian mystic from New York City, whom he used to visit in order to listen to his sermons. Goldsmith helped Adams to better understand his enlightenment and advised him to go see Paramahansa Yogananda. Adams did so and visited Yogananda at the Self-Realization Fellowship in Encinitas, California. Although he intended to be initiated as a monk there, Yogananda—after speaking with him—felt that Adams had his own path and should go to India. Yogananda told him that his satguru was Sri Ramana Maharshi and that he should go as soon as possible because Ramana Maharshi's body was old and in ill health.

=== Ramana Maharshi ===
With $14,000 of inheritance money from a recently deceased aunt, Adams set off in 1946 for India and his guru Sri Ramana Maharshi , who lived at Sri Ramanasramam at the foot of Arunachala in Tamil Nadu, South India. In Adams' words:

When I was eighteen years old, I arrived at Tiruvannamalai. In those days they didn't have jet planes. It was a propeller plane. I purchased flowers and a bag of fruit to bring to Ramana. I took the rickshaw to the ashram. It was about 8:30 a.m. I entered the hall and there was Ramana on his couch reading his mail. It was after breakfast. I brought the fruit and the flowers over and laid them at his feet. There was a guardrail in front of him to prevent fanatics from attacking him with love. And then I sat down in front of him. He looked at me and smiled, and I smiled back. I have been to many teachers, many saints, many sages. I was with Nisargadatta, Anandamayi Ma, Papa Ramdas, Neem Karoli Baba and many others, but never did I meet anyone who exuded such compassion, such love, such bliss as Ramana Maharshi. (Note: Godman, David (2008, June 11th), Arunachala and Sri Ramana Maharshi Blog - Robert Adams Again)

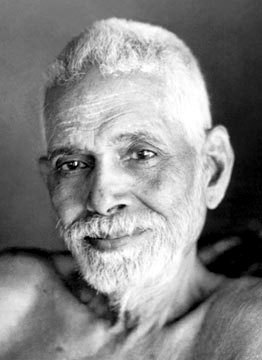
Bhagavan Sri Ramana Maharshi

Adams stayed at Sri Ramana's ashram for the final three years of his guru's life. According to Adams, he had many conversations with Sri Ramana Maharshi over the course of this time and by abiding in his presence was able to confirm and further understand his own experience of awakening to the non-dual Self. In the first of these conversations, Ramana Maharshi told Adams that they had been together in previous life. After Sri Ramana Maharshi left the body in 1950, Adams spent a further 17 years traveling around India (Note: Arthur Osborne, a writer and devotee of Sri Ramana Maharshi, was reputed to have given some money to Adams in order for him to travel around India after Sri Ramana Maharshi died.) and stayed with well-known gurus such as Nisargadatta Maharaj, (Note: Adams is said to have stayed six months with Nisargadatta Maharaj, at the time when Ramesh Balsekar was his interpreter.) Anandamayi Ma, Neem Karoli Baba, and Swami Ramdas, to name but a few. He also spent time with less well-known teachers such as Swami Brahmadanda, "the Staff of God," in the holy city of Varanasi.

=== Family life ===
Adams' wife, Nicole Adams, wrote My Marriage to the Western Mystic ROBERT ADAMS, discussing their marriage and family life with their two children, both daughters.

=== Later years ===
In the late 1960s, Adams returned to the United States and lived in Hawaii and Los Angeles before finally moving to Sedona, Arizona in the mid-1990s. (Note: Clear biographical details of Adams' life, from the 1950s up until the 1990s, are hard to come by as he rarely talked about his past.) In the 1980s Adams developed Parkinson's disease, which forced him to settle in one location and receive appropriate care.

A small group of devotees soon grew up around him and in the early 1990s he gave weekly satsangs in the San Fernando Valley, along with other surrounding areas of Los Angeles. These satsangs were both recorded and transcribed. After several years of deteriorating health, Adams died at the age of 69 from cancer of the liver on March 2, 1997 in Sedona, surrounded by family members and devotees.

=== Controversy ===
None of Adams' claims of visiting India or Ramana Ashram have ever been verified. His claims of living in Arthur Osborne's house have been questioned by Kitty Osborne and Michael James and found to be likely made up. Ramana Ashram's The Mountain Path has also concluded that Adams was never there:

There is the curious case of Robert Adams, an American guru who claimed to have been at Sri Ramana's ashram between 1947–48 and 1952 (the dates vary in his conversations), and to have moved closely with Bhagavan. Until objective, verifiable evidence emerges to substantiate this claim, we can only conclude that his account is unreliable.

Adams' claim to remember experiences from infancy is regarded as fantasy, inasmuch as the earliest age for memory recall is typically around two years old, even for major events such as hospitalization or birth of a sibling.

== Teachings ==
=== Confessions of a Jnani ===
The teacher is really yourself. You have created a teacher to wake you up. The teacher would not be here if you were not dreaming about the teacher. You have created a teacher out of your mind in order to awaken, to see that there is no teacher, no world - nothing. You've done this all by yourself.

— Robert Adams, The Mountain Path

Adams did not consider himself to be a teacher, a philosopher, or a preacher. What he imparted, he said, was simply the confession of a jnani. He said he confessed his and everyone else's own reality, and encouraged students not to listen to him with their heads but with their hearts.

Adams' way of communicating to his devotees was often amusing, and with interludes of silence or music between questions and answers. He stated that there was no such thing as a new teaching. This view can be found in the Upanishads, the Vedas, and other Hindu scriptures. (Note: The Ashtavakra Gita, for instance, was a beloved scripture of both Adams and Sri Ramana Maharshi.)

=== Silence of the Heart ===
Adams wrote no books himself and published none of his teachings because he did not wish to gain a large following. He instead preferred to teach a small number of dedicated seekers. However, in 1992, a book of his dialogues was transcribed, compiled, and distributed by and for the sole use of his devotees. (Note: Muzika, Ed, (1992) Photographs of First Edition - Silence of the Heart - First Edition) (Note: After being shown the first edition of Silence of the Heart in 1994, H. W. L. Poonja read out the whole book at his satsang in Lucknow. Something he never did for any other living teacher.) In 1999, a later edition of this book, Silence of the Heart: Dialogues with Robert Adams, was posthumously published by Acropolis Books Inc. (Note: Acropolis Books is a publishing company, set up in 1993, with the sole purpose of publishing and preserving the books of Adams' first spiritual mentor, Joel S. Goldsmith.) As conveyed by the title of these dialogues, Adams considered silence to be the highest of spiritual teachings:

The highest teaching in the world is silence. There is nothing higher than this. A devotee who sits with a Sage purifies his mind just by being with the Sage. The mind automatically becomes purified. No words exchanged, no words said. Silence is the ultimate reality. Everything exists in this world through silence. True silence really means going deep within yourself to that place where nothing is happening, where you transcend time and space. You go into a brand new dimension of nothingness. That's where all the power is. That's your real home. That's where you really belong, in deep Silence where there is no good and bad, no one trying to achieve anything. Just being, pure being.

=== Advaita Vedanta ===
Robert Adams - I Am That
Robert Adams talking to students at satsang (4 November 1990).

Although Adams was never initiated into a religious order or spiritual practice, nor did he become a renunciate, his teachings were described by Dennis Waite as being firmly based in the Vedic philosophy and Hindu tradition of Advaita Vedanta. Advaita (non-dual in Sanskrit) refers to the ultimate and supreme reality, Brahman (Note: Brahman, with the accent on the second syllable, is not to be confused with the Hindu god Brahmā nor the Hindu class/caste Brahmin.)—which, according to Ramana Maharshi as interpreted by some of his devotees, is the substratum of the manifest universe—and, if describable at all, could be defined as pure consciousness. Another term for Brahman is Ātman. The word Ātman is used when referring to Brahman as the inmost spirit of man. Ātman and Brahman are not different realities but identical in nature.

Adams used a metaphor to explain this:

A clay pot has space inside of it and outside of it. The space inside is not any different from the space outside. When the clay pot breaks, the space merges the inside with the outside. It's only space. So it is with us. Your body is like a clay pot, and it appears you have to go within to find the truth. The outward appears to be within you. The outward is also without you. There's boundless space. When the body is transcended, it's like a broken clay pot. The Self within you becomes the Self outside of you ... as it's always been. The Self merges with the Self. Some people call the inner Self the Ātman. And yet it is called Brahman. When there is no body in the way, the Atman and the Brahman become one... they become free and liberated.

As Adams explained, those in search of liberation from the manifest world will gain it only when the mind becomes quiescent. The world is in fact nothing other than the creation of the mind, and only by the removal of all thoughts, including the "I"-thought, will the true reality of Brahman shine forth. In order to achieve this, Adams taught self-enquiry, as previously taught by Sri Ramana Maharshi.

=== Self-enquiry ===
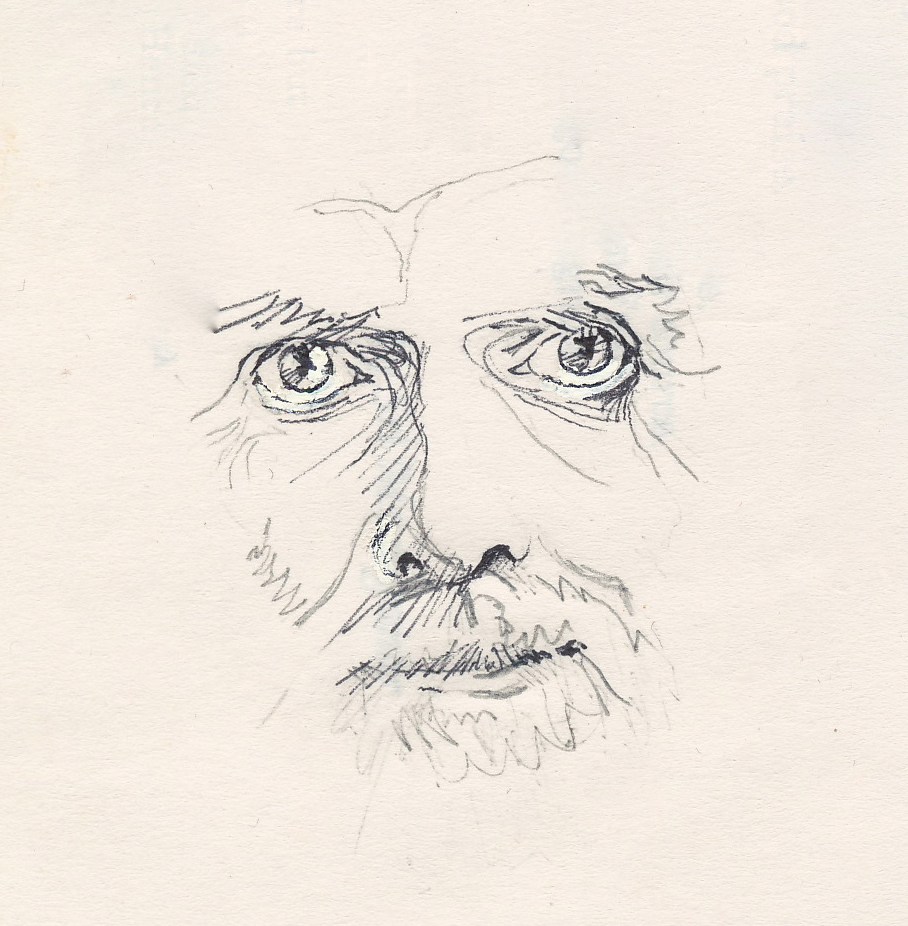
Sketch of Robert Adams in 1996.

In his weekly satsangs, Adams advocated the practice of self-enquiry (ātma-vichāra) as the principal means of transcending the ego and realizing oneself as sat-chit-ananda (being-consciousness-bliss). After acknowledging to oneself that one exists, and that—whether awake, dreaming, or in deep sleep—one always exists, one then responds to every thought that arises with the question "Who am I?":

What you are really doing is, you're finding the source of the 'I'. You're looking for the source of 'I', the personal 'I'. 'Who am I?' You're always talking about the personal 'I'. 'Who is this I? Where did it come from? Who gave it birth?' Never answer those questions. Pose those questions, but never answer them ... do nothing, absolutely nothing. You're watching the thoughts come. As soon as the thoughts come, in a gentle way you enquire, 'To whom do these thoughts come? They come to me. I think them. Who is this I? Where did it come from? How did it arise? From where did it arise? Who is the I? Who am I?' You remain still. The thoughts come again. You do the same thing again and again and again.

=== Four Principles of Self-Realization ===
Adams rarely gave a sadhana to his devotees; however, he did often have visions, (Note: Adams would explain that visions were not the same as dreams. A vision is an actual experience that occurs in the phenomenal world. After Sri Ramana Maharshi died, Adams would have visions of them walking along the Ganges together and discussing simple things like the weather.) and in one such vision he gave a teaching as the Buddha. He visualized himself sitting under a tree in a beautiful open field with a lake and a forest nearby. He was wearing the orange garb of a Buddhist renunciate. All of a sudden, hundreds of bodhisattvas and mahasattvas came out of the forest and sat down in a semi-circle around Adams as the Buddha. Together they proceeded to meditate for several hours. Afterwards, one of the bodhisattvas stood up and asked the Buddha what he taught. The Buddha answered, "I teach Self-realization of Noble Wisdom." Again they sat in silence for three hours before another bodhisattva stood up and asked how people could tell whether they were close to self-realization. In reply, Adams as the Buddha gave the bodhisattvas and mahasattvas four principles, which he named The Four Principles of Self-Realization of Noble Wisdom: (Note: Godman, David (2008, June 5th), Arunachala and Sri Ramana Maharshi Blog - Robert Adams On Self-Enquiry)

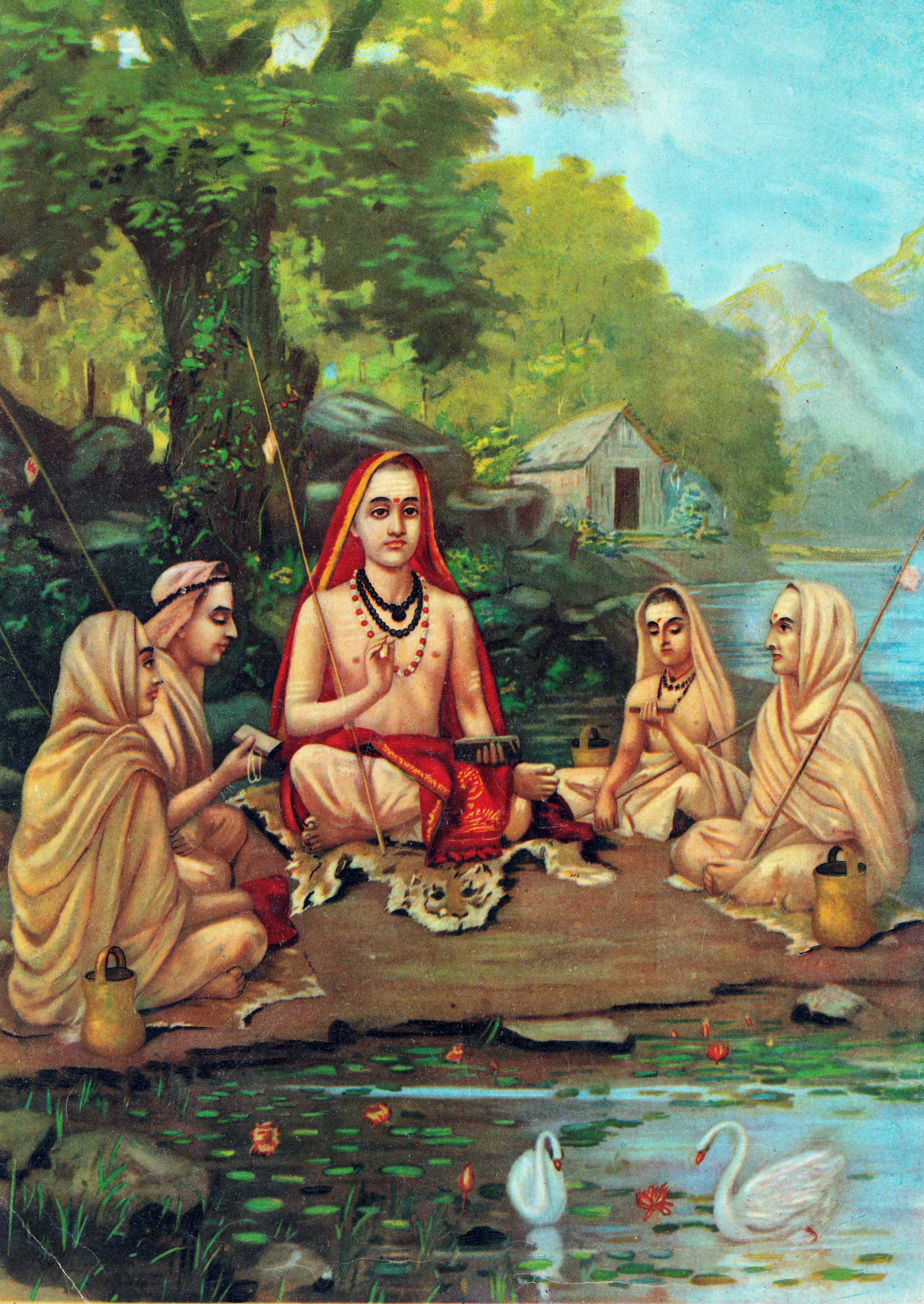
Adi Shankara with Disciples, by Raja Ravi Varma, 1904.

- First Principle: You have a feeling, a complete understanding that everything you see, everything in the universe, in the world, emanates from your mind. In other words, you feel this. You do not have to think about it, or try to bring it on. It comes by itself. It becomes a part of you. The realization that everything you see, the universe, people, worms, insects, the mineral kingdom, the vegetable kingdom, your body, your mind, everything that appears, is a manifestation of your mind.
- Second Principle: You have a strong feeling, a deep realization, that you are unborn. You are not born, you do not experience a life, and you do not disappear, you do not die ... You exist as I Am. You have always existed and you will always exist. You exist as pure intelligence, as absolute reality. That is your true nature. You exist as sat-chit-ananda. You exist as bliss consciousness ... But you do not exist as the body. You do not exist as person, place or thing.
- Third Principle: You are aware and you have a deep understanding of the egolessness of all things; that everything has no ego. I'm not only speaking of sentient beings. I'm speaking of the mineral kingdom, the vegetable kingdom, the animal kingdom, the human kingdom. Nothing has an ego. There is no ego ... It means that everything is sacred. Everything is God. Only when the ego comes, does God disappear ... When there is no ego, you have reverence for everybody and everything ... There is only divine consciousness, and everything becomes divine consciousness.
- Fourth Principle: You have a deep understanding, a deep feeling, of what self-realization of noble wisdom really is ... You can never know by trying to find out what it is, because it's absolute reality. You can only know by finding out what it is not. So you say: it is not my body, it is not my mind, it is not my organs, it is not my thoughts, it is not my world, it is not my universe, it is not the animals, or the trees, or the moon, or the sun, or the stars. it is not any of those things. When you've gone through everything and there's nothing left—that is what it is: nothing." Emptiness. Nirvana. Ultimate Oneness.

=== Imaginative story telling ===
Although Adams' stories about staying at Ramana's ashram and having personal conversations with him have been regarded by some as entertaining, Osborne (a longtime ashram resident), along with others, has noted that these stories appear to come from someone who with little or no understanding of the actual situation at the ashram or of Ramana's habits.

For example, Adams claimed to have stayed at the ashram for over eight months, attending all of Ramana's meetings, and yet he was never seen, noted, or remembered by anyone who was actually there. In fact, Westerners were always noted, written about and photographed by the ashram, as a visit from a Westerner was highly unusual and consistently well documented.

Adams claimed to have personal English conversations with Ramana without a translator, apparently unaware that Ramana generally never spoke English without a translator. For instance, Adams told one such story at length during his August 2, 1992, satsang about a chat at the Osborne house in which he said the two of them talked about various things such as self-enquiry, the maturity and sincerity of seekers, and a number of other topics. Osborne noted the unlikelihood:

"They supposedly had long chats there. Who was their interpreter? That whole story is a fabrication. Bhagavan understood English pretty well, but he barely spoke it at all. As I have explained earlier, Bhagavan never went into any house, including ours. My goodness if he had, the whole street, town, country, would have known about it. It would have become a landmark day for our family and remembered for ever more. It would have been written about by the diligent scribes who religiously recorded every word Bhagavan uttered and everyone who came into his presence!

Adams claimed to have private personal visits with Ramana inside the Osborne house when in actuality Ramana never went inside a grihasta (householder's) home after 1896 and did not leave the ashram front gates after 1929 except on two well-noted occasions, neither of which involved going to the Osborne house.

In his August 9, 1992 satsang, Adams told a story of sadhus rolling boulders down the hill from the caves above Skandashram in an attempt to murder Ramana, apparently unaware that there are no caves above Skandashram despite having previously claimed to have lived there for years. This would have been noticed in minutes by anyone who was actually there:

When he [Ramana] was living in askandha ashram which is up on the hill in Arunachala. In those days there were many people or sadhus living in the other caves above him. [...] Now the sadhus lived above him about fifty feet above him in the cave became jealous. They decided to kill him. So they rolled boulders down on him.

Many of Adams' stories involved money that did not take into account for the monetary inflation in India between the 1940s and 1990s, such as his story of Henry Wells:

I recall a Westerner, I'm trying to think of his name, Henry Wells, from Scotland. He apparently had read a lot of books about Ramana, and this was his first visit. He came into the hall, and I was watching this. Ran over to Ramana and prostrated himself on his stomach, and started going crazy. His feet were shaking, and he was chanting. The devotees wanted to pick him up, and Ramana said, "Let him stay." When he came out of it he told Ramana, "At last I have found you. You are my father, my mother, my son, my daughter, my friend." And Ramana just smiled at him. And I said to myself, I was only eighteen years old, I said to myself, "Someone who is this enthusiastic, let's see what happens if it lasts."

The days went by and he kept prostrating himself every day for about a month.

Then he finally stopped and he sat down like everybody else. And after about two months he started looking around the room at everybody, and he started complaining, that this wasn't right, that wasn't right. After about four months of being there he donated forty thousand dollars to the ashram, and I'm just watching all these things going on.

Apparently, Adams failed to realize the unlikelihood of a Scotsman donating dollars and the fact that $40,000 in 1950 could have likely bought the entire town of Tiruvannamalai. That would most certainly have at least noted by someone at the ashram itself.

Adams claimed to have donated a jeep to the ashram although it possessed no jeep or car until 2018.

According to Ed Muzika in a Yoga Journal article:

"During the fall of 1946 Robert traveled to India, arriving by train in the town of Tiruvannamalai, a few miles from Arunachala mountain, the site of Ramana Maharshi's ashram. Early the next day, while walking to ward the ashram, he spotted Ramana coming down the path toward him. An electrifying energy coursed through his body. He felt completely opened. As Ramana got closer, Robert stripped off all his clothes and dropped at his guru's feet. Ramana reached down, grabbed Robert by his shoulders, looked into his eyes and said, "I have been waiting for you. Get up! Get up!"

Yet Ramana never treated anyone as special or claimed to have been waiting for he or she to finally arrive.

Adams also claimed that Ramana used to cover himself with mud and tell visitors that Ramana didn't live there any more in order to get rid of them, when in fact he never lied, was always scrupulously clean, and always warmly welcomed all comers to the ashram, pundits or not:

[Ramana...] would rub himself with mud and become filthy and sit there in the mud. And when they'd come by they would say, "Where does the sage live?" and he would say, "he's gone, he doesn't live here anymore," and then they would inquire up the hill and they would say, "you just passed him sitting in the mud." (laughter) And they would become disillusioned and go away.

Although events in many of Adams' stories were claimed to have happened to him, they could actually be found in various Hindu texts. Others were highly imaginative descriptions meant to contain some type of parable or spiritual truth that he apparently made up on the spot and told entertainingly as "first-person" accounts.

== Selected bibliography ==
- Adams, Robert (1999). Silence of the Heart: Dialogues with Robert Adams, Acropolis Books Inc. ISBN 978-1889051536.
- Adams, Robert (1992). Silence of the Heart, Volume II: Spiritual Dialogues with Robert Adams. Sedona, AZ: Infinity Institute. ISBN 520322-PXU.
- Adams, Robert (2012). The Complete Works (PDF) (E-book). Archived from the original (PDF) on 2016-09-16. Transcripts of recorded talks from April 1990 through 1993.

== See also ==
- Ramana Maharshi
- Paramahansa Yogananda
- Joel S. Goldsmith
- Nisargadatta Maharaj
- Anandamayi Ma
- Neem Karoli Baba
- Paramacharya
- Advaita Vedanta
- Brahman
- Self-enquiry
- Jnana Yoga
- Lankavatara Sutra
- Siddhi
