= Fort Lytton Historic Military Precinct =

- IUCN category II (national park)
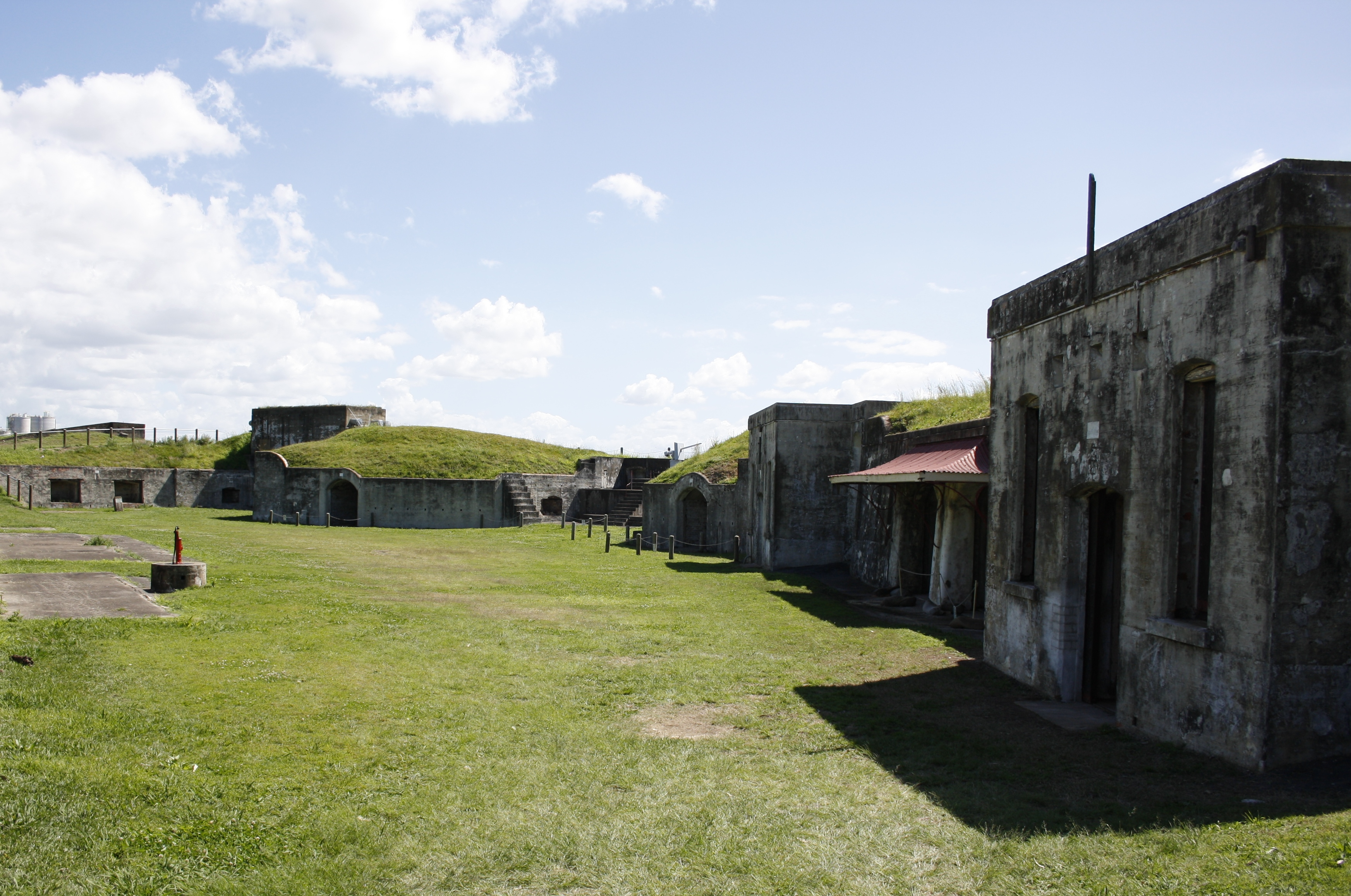
- Inside the colonial fort.

- Location within Australia
- Location: Queensland, Brisbane
- Coordinates: 27°24′38″S 153°09′04″E
- Website: Official website

Fort Lytton Historic Military Precinct is the main attraction of Fort Lytton National Park in Queensland, Australia.

The Precinct contains historic Fort Lytton (a colonial coastal defence fort), and numerous other historic military buildings and structures from colonial times to the World War II. The precinct is at the epicentre of what was once a one square mile (259 ha) defence base strategically located at the mouth of the Brisbane River (the base was also called “Fort Lytton”). The precinct also contains Fort Lytton Military Museum and is the site of regular military re-enactments. The national park is located in the Brisbane suburb of Lytton.

== Gallery ==
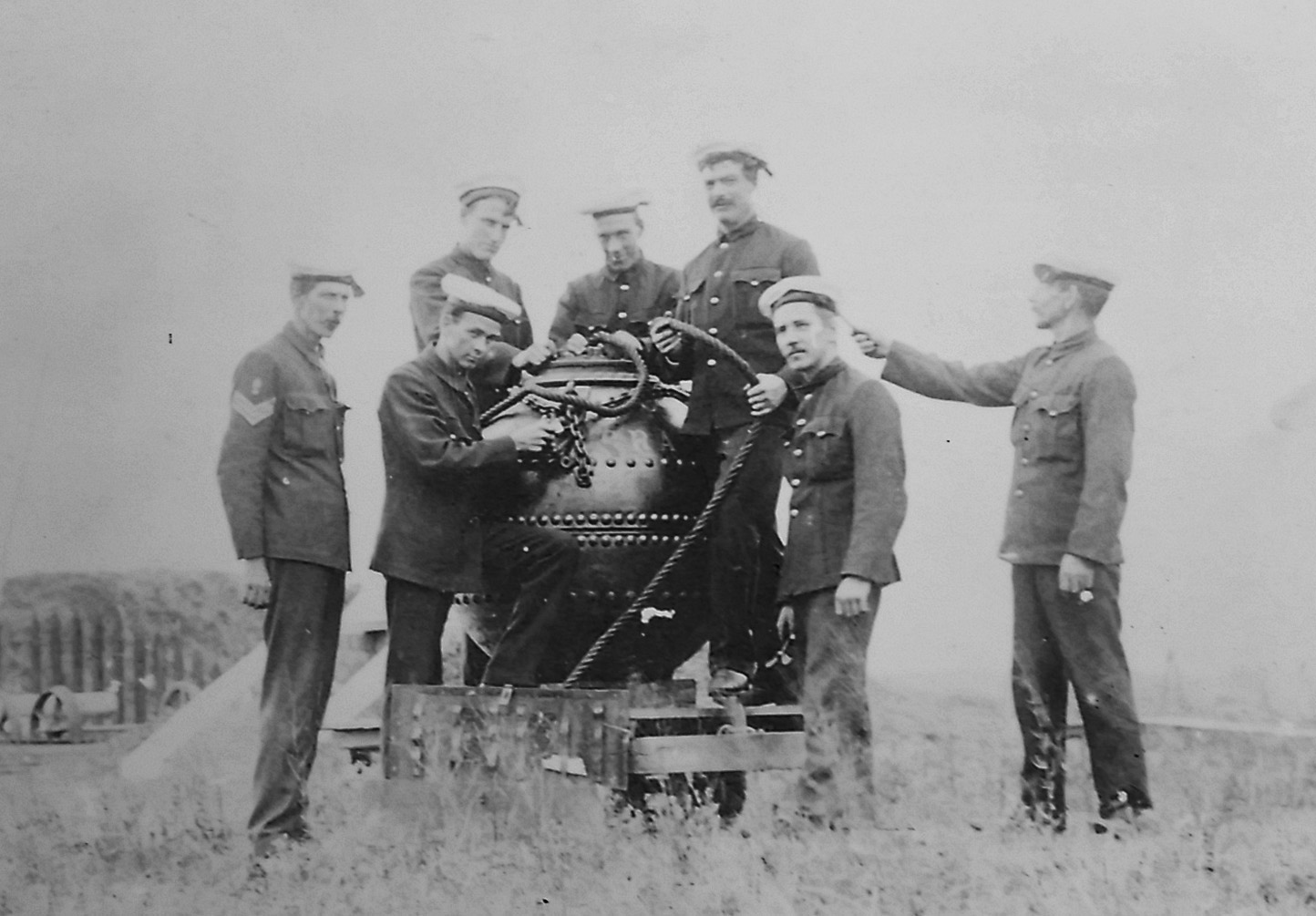
Submarine mining engineers at Fort Lytton c.1890.

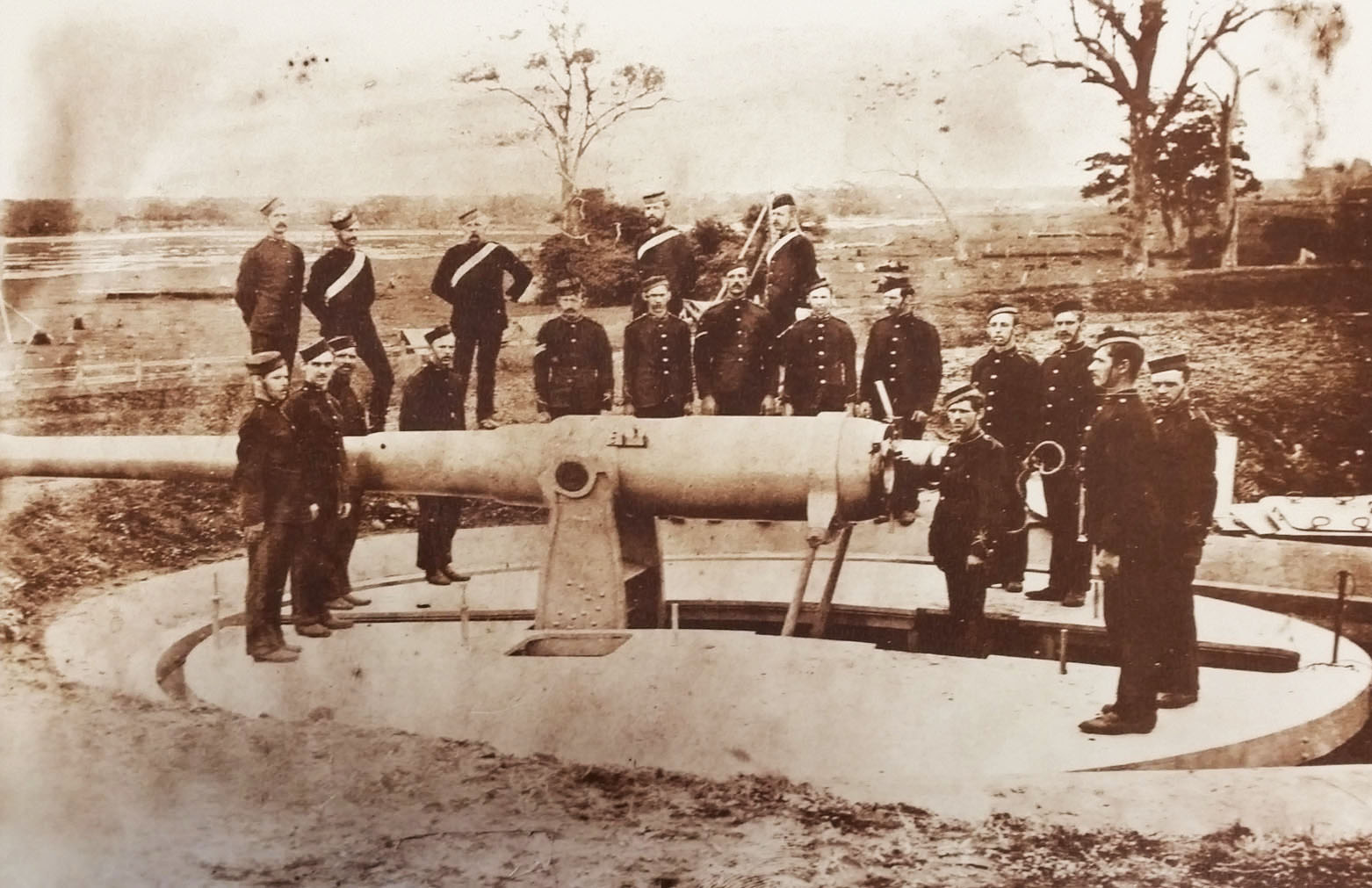
100pdr Disappearing Gun in Firing Position at Fort Lytton c.1890.

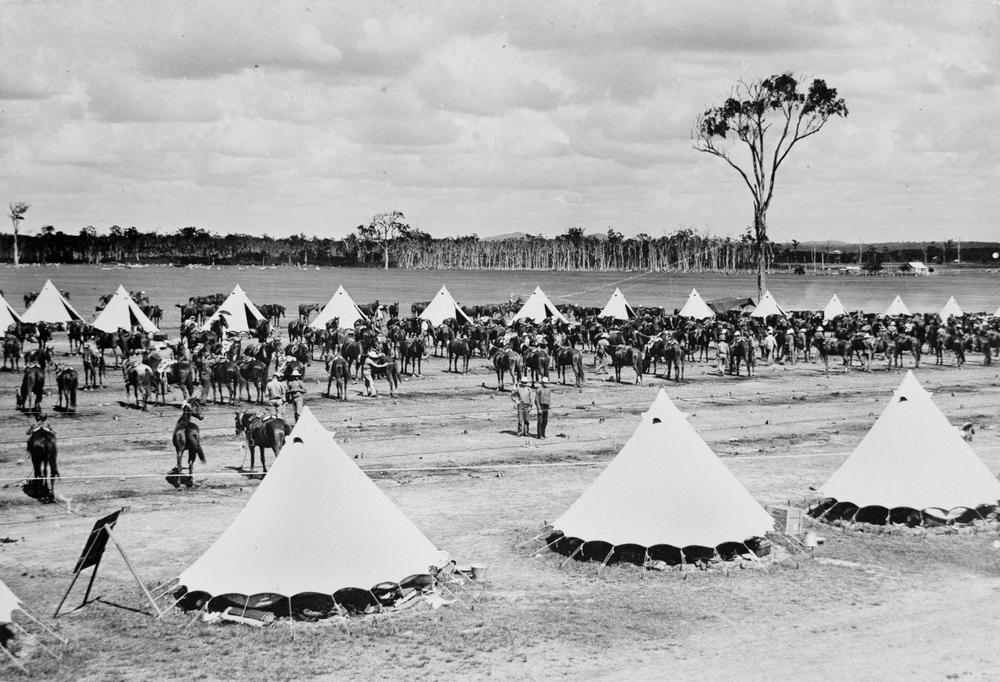
Mounted infantry encamped at Fort Lytton c1899.

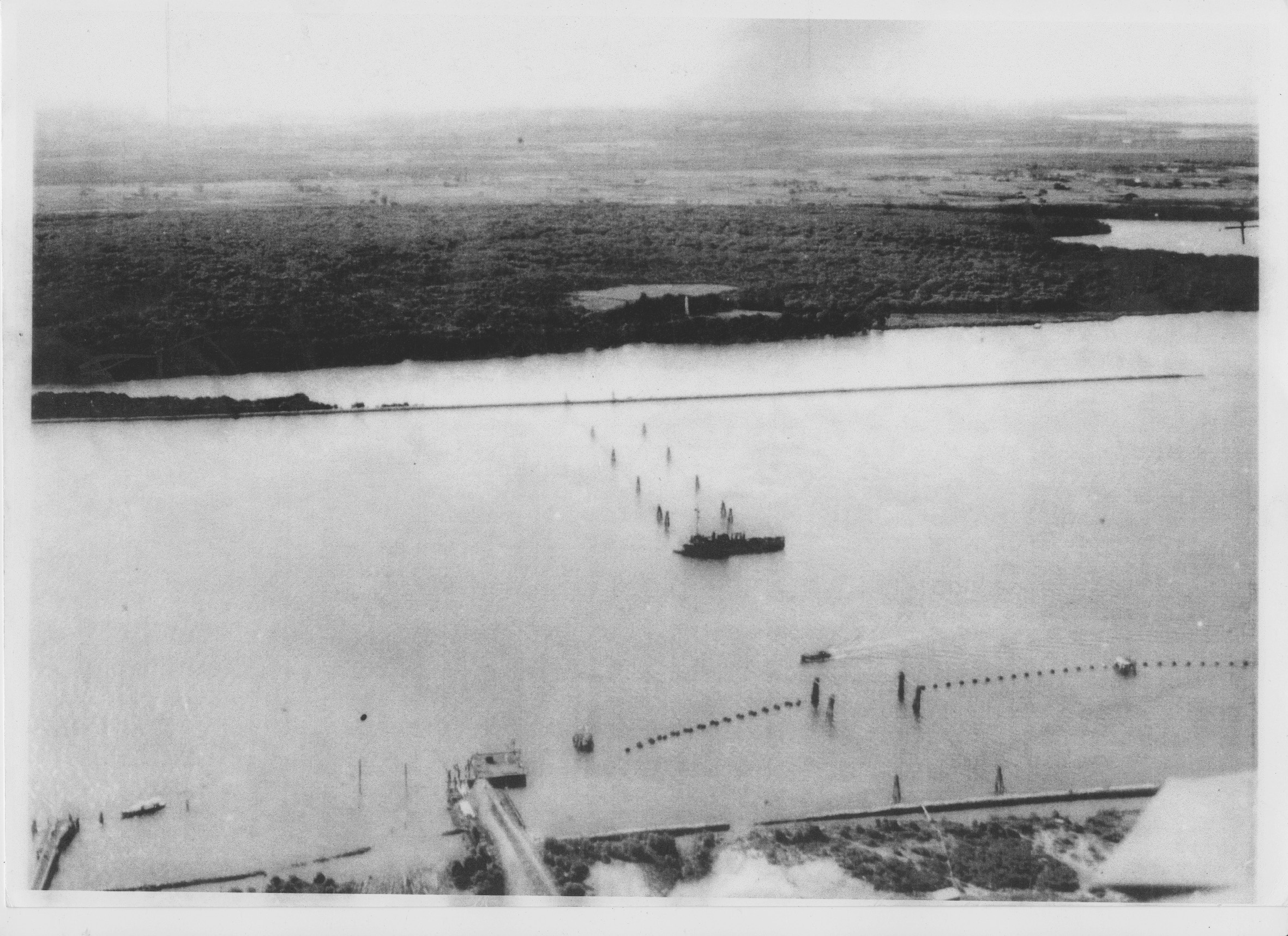
Anti-submarine barrier across Brisbane River at Fort Lytton 1943.

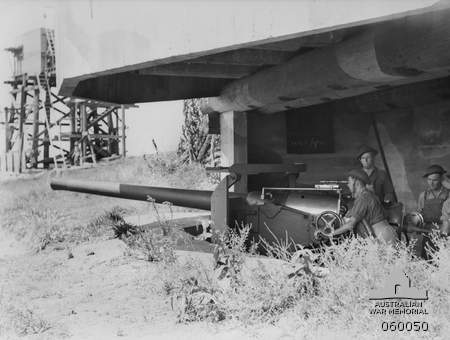
4.7inch gun emplacement at Fort Lytton 1943.

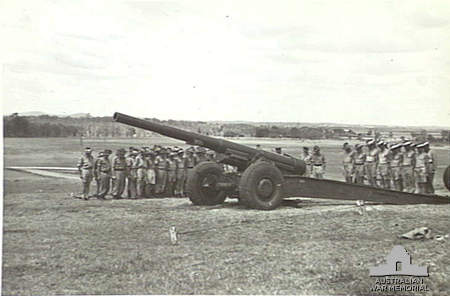
Armistice day service beside 155mm heavy gun at Fort Lytton 11 Nov 1943.

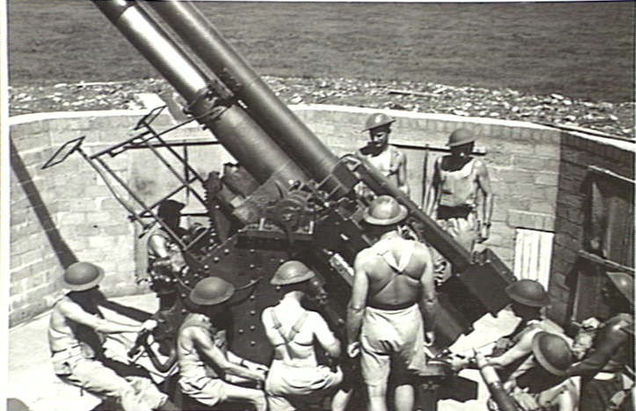
3.7inch heavy anti-aircraft gun at Fort Lytton 1943.

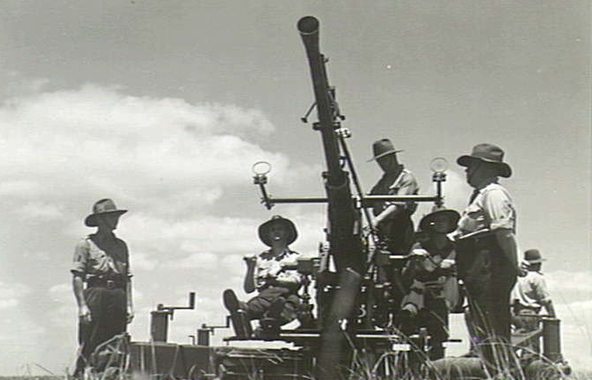
Bofors light anti-aircraft gun at Fort Lytton 1944.
