= Robert Stanley Adams =

American politician (1895–1943)

R. Stanley Adams circa 1939

Robert Stanley Adams (August 27, 1895 – April 1, 1943) served in the Florida State Senate for the 30th district.

== Early life ==
Adams was born August 27, 1895, in Jasper, Florida to Frank Adams and Alice Vivian née West Adams. He went to public school in Jacksonville, Florida and then attended the University of South at Sewanee, Tennessee. He served in the U.S. Navy during World War I as a painter and naval stores operator. He served in the U.S. Navy as part of the 6th Naval District.

== Career ==
Adams was the president of the Barnett National Bank in Jacksonville, Florida.

He was a Mason and a Methodist.

== Political career ==
Before joining the Florida Legislature he served on the Hamilton County Commission for ten years.

He was elected to the Florida Senate in 1934, 1938, and unopposed in his final term in 1942. His father Frank Adams and grandfather Robert Watkins Adams also served in the legislature as senators.

He was the chairman of the agriculture and livestock committee in 1943 and was also a member of several other committees. He co-sponsored the Rural Electric Cooperative Act.

He died early in his third term as a state senator. After his death the law required governor Spessard Holland to call, within 10 days, for a special election to fill the vacancy without the requirement for any primaries.

== Death ==
He died on April 1, 1943, (aged 47), at his plantation and home near Jasper, Florida. He was survived by his wife, Priscilla B Adams and three of his children, Frances Adams, Cornelia Caleb Tarplee and Robert Stanley Adams, as well as four siblings.

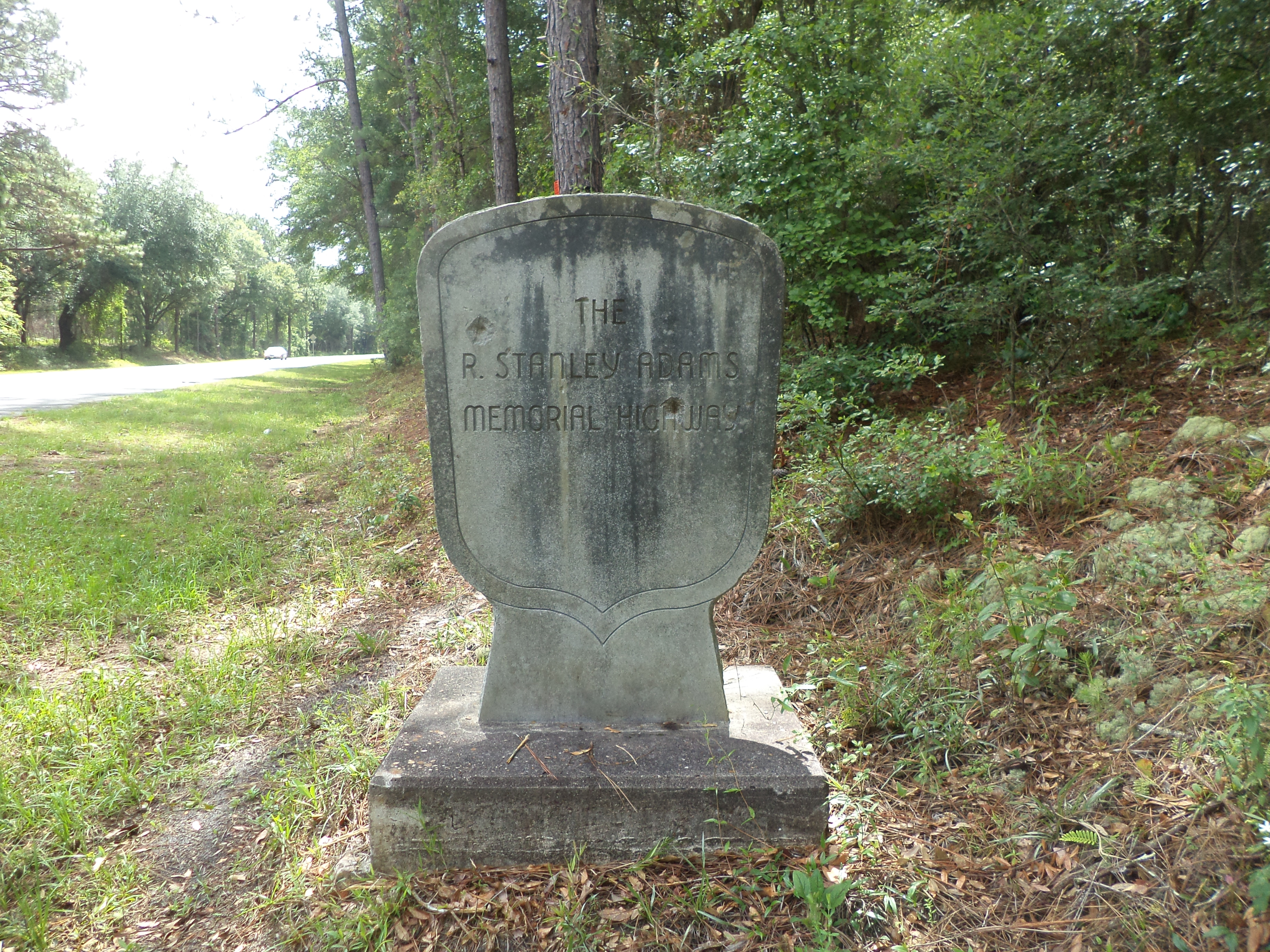
R. Stanley Adams Memorial Highway marker

The R. Stanley Adams Memorial Highway section of Florida State Road 6 was named for him and a marker laid.
