= Bob Adams (road manager) =

British road manager

Bob Adams is a British road manager (retired 1981) who worked for many top artists of the 1960s and 1970s including The Beatles, Cliff Richard and The Shadows, The Everly Brothers, Bo Diddley, Paul McCartney and Wings. John Lennon referred to him as “Old Bob”.
