= 480 Queen Street =

153-metre (502 ft) premium grade office tower in Brisbane, Australia

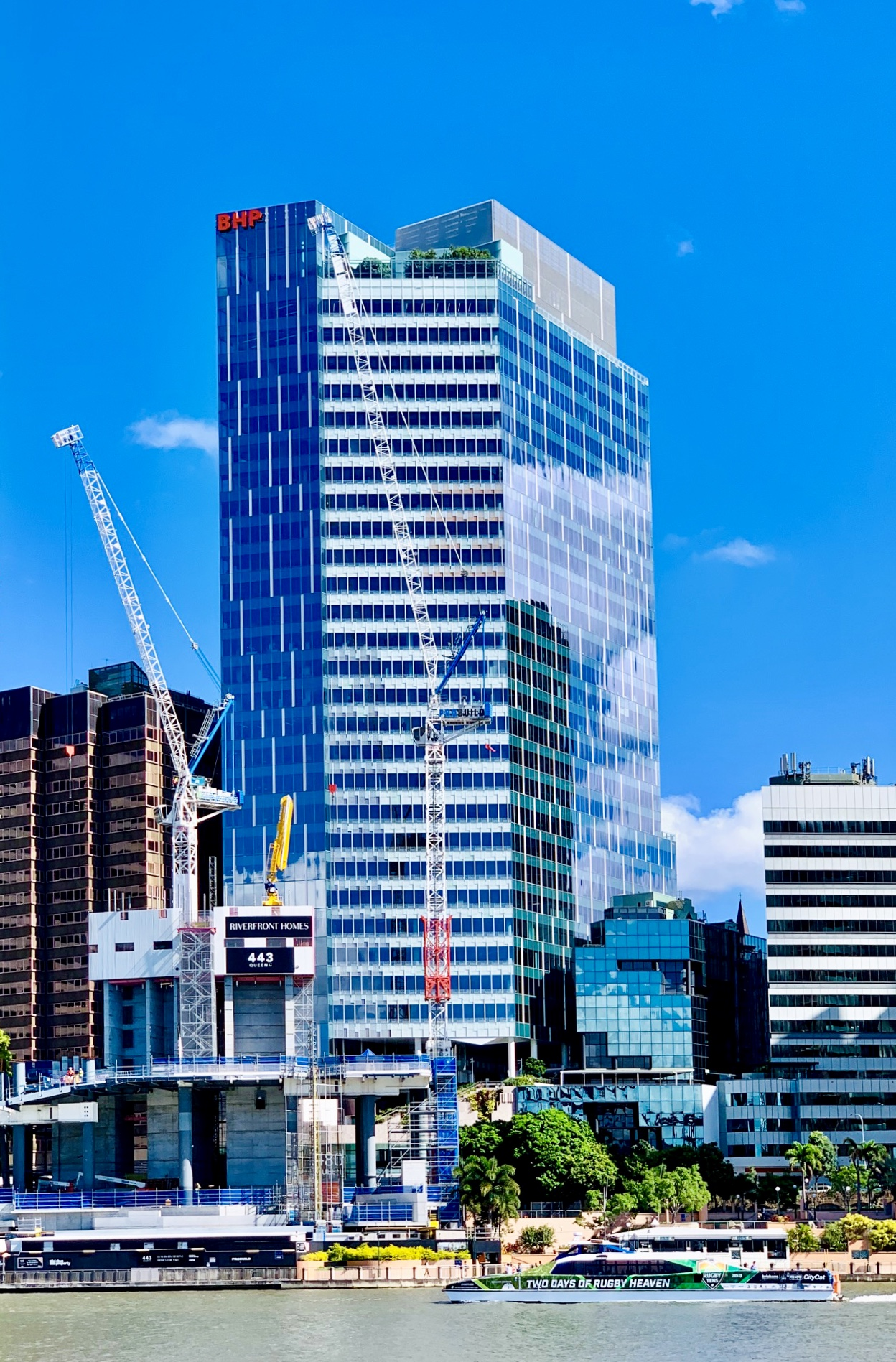
- Building in 2019

General information
- Status: Completed
- Type: Office
- Location: Brisbane, Australia, 480 Queen Street, Brisbane
- Coordinates: 27.4644°S 153.0307°E
- Construction started: est. early 2013
- Opening: 2015
- Cost: A$300 million

Height
- Height: 153 metres (502 ft)

Technical details
- Floor count: 34, plus 2.5 levels of basement car parking
- Floor area: 55,663 m^{2} (599,152 sq ft)

Design and construction
- Architecture firm: BVN & Donovan Hill
- Developer: Grocon
- Other designers: Cundall Johnston & Partners (ESD Consultant)
- Main contractor: Grocon

Other information
- Parking: 265

480 Queen Street is a 153-metre (502 ft) premium grade office tower in Brisbane, Australia located at 480 Queen Street in the Brisbane central business district's golden triangle. The project was designed by BVN Architecture and developed and constructed by Grocon, in partnership with Dexus.

A key design feature is a 1,400-square-metre (15,000 sq ft) area known as Hobbs Park with river views on level four, open to all tenants and the public. As well as adding to the amenity for tenants, it makes a significant community contribution by preserving the river views from the St John's Cathedral grounds. Other building features include 600 bike spaces and 45 showers to complement its proximity to the riverside bikeway, floor plates of up to 2,800 m^{2} (30,000 sq ft), about twice the size of other premium CBD towers, 1,600 m^{2} (17,000 sq ft) of retail at ground, second and fourth levels will include high quality food and beverage outlets designed to enhance the broader precinct and a rooftop tree grove at level 31.

It is intended to be 6-star Green Star and 5-star NABERS rated. 480 Queen Street has achieved early leasing success with 80 per cent of the building's 55,000 m^{2} (590,000 sq ft) of office space leased to BHP, HWL Ebsworth, Herbert Smith Freehills, Allens, DLA Piper, PwC and IWG.

480 Queen Street is Grocon's third Brisbane construction project and follows the Common Ground affordable housing project in Hope Street, South Brisbane and an office building for the Australian Taxation Office in 55 Elizabeth Street.

== History ==
The building was approved for development by the Brisbane City Council in September 2012.

Building construction began in April 2013 and was due for completion by early 2016.

== Tenants ==
- BHP
- PwC
- HWL Ebsworth
- Herbert Smith Freehills
- Allens
- DLA Piper
- F1rst Class Fitness
- Jimmy Rods Shave Saloon
- Juniper Networks
- Necta Espresso
- Terra Firma
- Regus

== See also ==
- List of tallest buildings in Brisbane
