= Mercy Heritage Centre Brisbane =

Museum in Brisbane, Queensland, Australia

Coordinates: 27.4608°S 153.0332°E

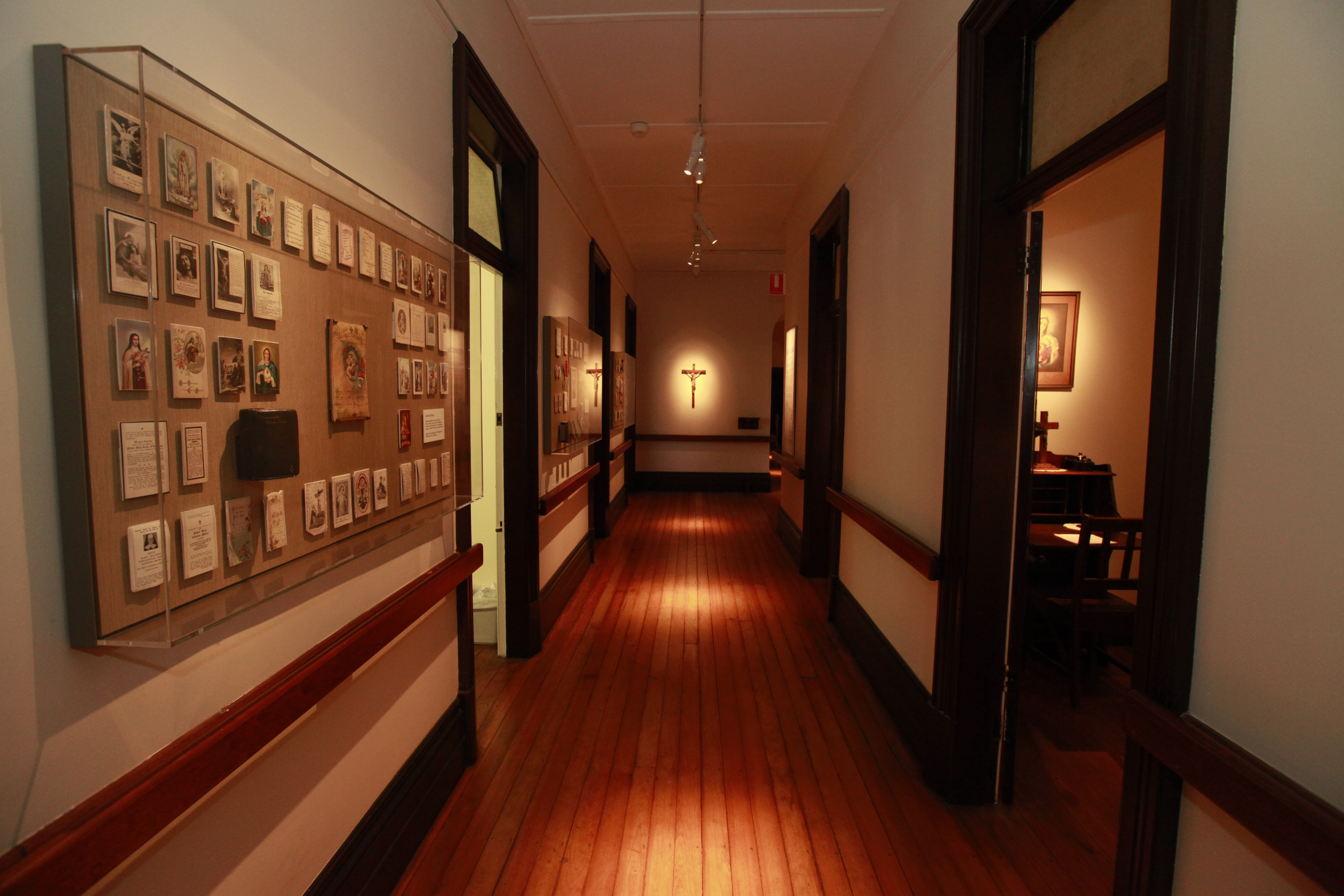
Our Lady's Corridor

The Mercy Heritage Centre Brisbane was a social history museum which is now closed and will re-open in June 2019 as Adderton: house & heart of mercy.

== All Hallows' Convent ==
The original core of the building (Adderton) was constructed in 1858 by John Petrie and remains one of Brisbane's few pre-separation structures and one of the oldest surviving buildings in Queensland. Purchased for the Sisters of Mercy in 1863 and renamed Convent of Our Lady of Mercy All Hallows' on 1 November 1863, it was the first permanent home of the Brisbane Sisters of Mercy and as Mother House, the centre and source of growth for convents and schools throughout Queensland. Thus All Hallows' Convent became the base for a broad network of health, education and social welfare programs. Significant extensions were made to the convent in 1892, 1913 & 1919.

== All Hallows' Chapel ==
The chapel was constructed as part of the 1892 Convent extensions, blessed on 1 March of the same year and further extended in 1919. The earlier section is of Victorian style while the latter is early- Renaissance. The interior was refurbished in 1968 in accordance with Vatican II changes. The chapel is now managed by the Mercy Heritage Centre and includes displays, photographs and information relating to; the buildings evolution, religious practice, vestments and stained glass windows.

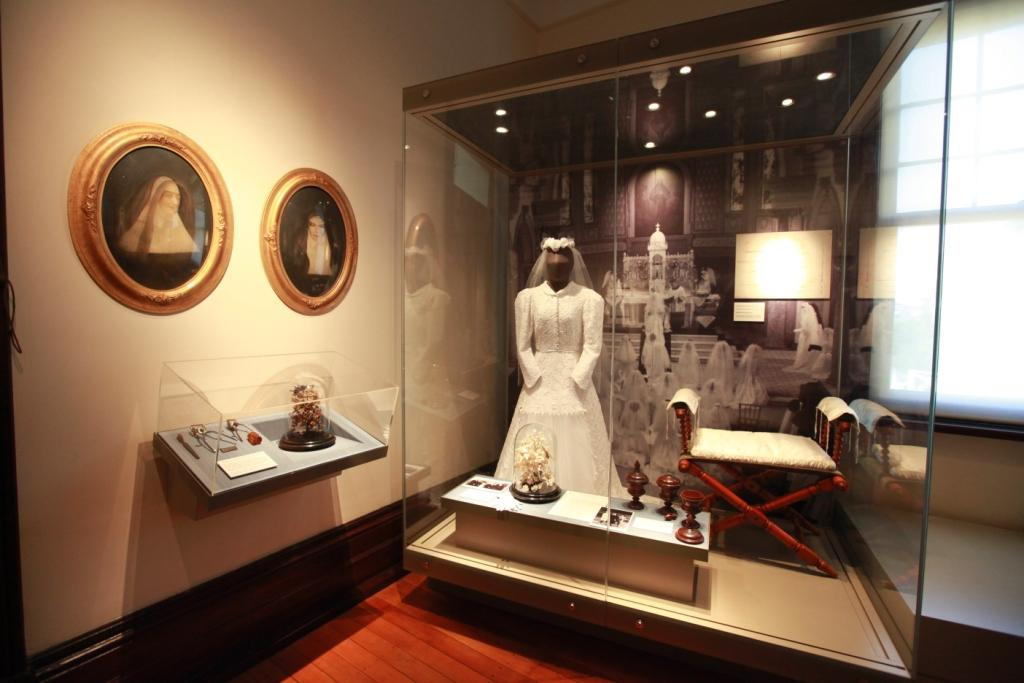
Novitiate exhibition

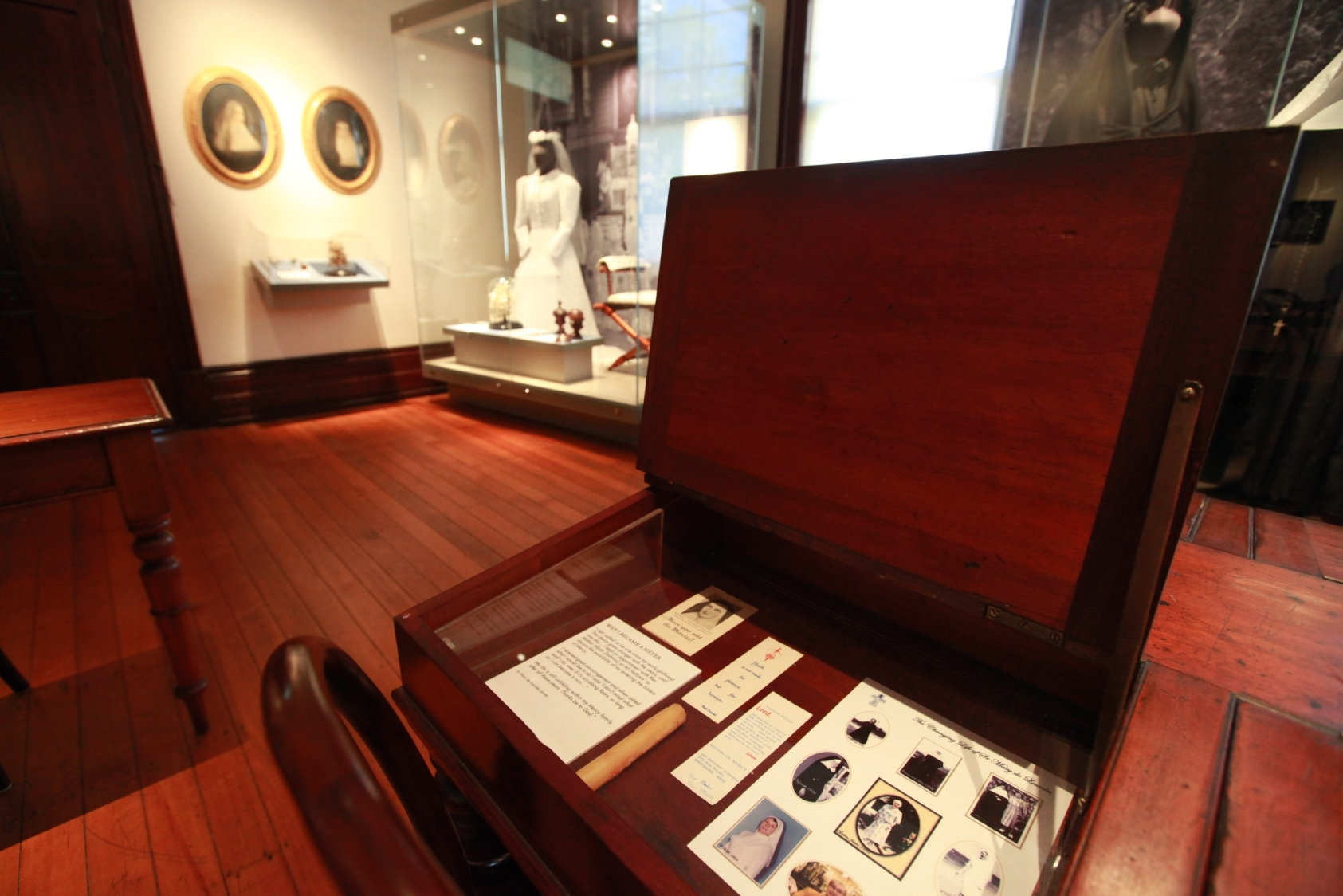
Novitiate exhibition
