= Robert Watkins Adams =

American soldier and politician (1839–1886)

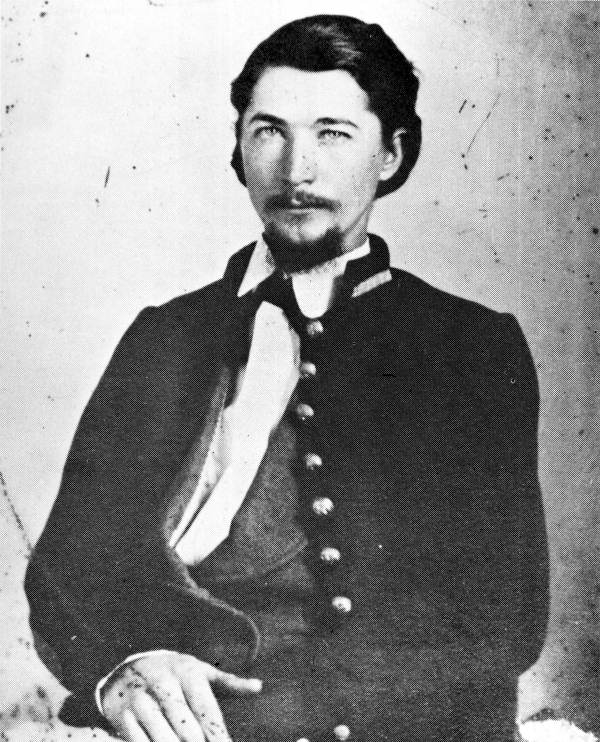

Senator in the Florida Senate
- In office 1870–1873

Personal details
- Born: October 20, 1839 Athens, Georgia
- Died: August 15, 1886 (aged 46)
- Education: University of Georgia

Robert Watkins Adams (October 20, 1839 – August 15, 1886) was a soldier during the American Civil War and a Florida State Senator. He was born in Athens, Georgia, served in the Confederate Army, and was imprisoned after the war. He lived in White Springs, Florida.

His parents were Nathaniel and Mary Mildred née Flournoy Adams. He graduated from the University of Georgia in 1859 and taught at a school in Hamilton County. He served under Captain Frink in the 5th Florida Regiment and rose to the rank of captain, commanding a company at Gettysburg. He married Sophia Broward in 1862 and had 5 children, Frank Adams, Nathaniel Adams, Robert Watkins Adams, Julia Adams and Minnie Adams. He was elected to the Florida Senate in 1870.

His son Frank Adams served in the Florida Legislature as a senator, as did his grandson Robert Stanley Adams.
