= Rob Adams (architect) =

Australian architect

Robert John Adams AM
- Born: 1948 (age 77–78); Zimbabwe
- Occupation: Architect
- Practice: Adams Urban, City of Melbourne
- Projects: Urban Design and Delivery City of Melbourne (1985—2020), CH2 building

Robert John Adams AM is an Australian architect and urban designer based in Melbourne. He worked at the City of Melbourne, Australia for 40 years, 24 of those as Director of City Design and Projects. He won multiple awards as the leader of the revitalisation of the Melbourne central business district and surrounds, helping to create a city streetscape with design features.

== Early life and education ==
Adams grew up in Southern Rhodesia (now Zimbabwe) and gained a B.Arch at the University of Cape Town (1966-1971), South Africa. He later did a Masters in Urban Design from Oxford Brookes University in England (1974-1977).

== Career ==
He helped establish an urban design course in Zimbabwe in 1978-80, before moving to Australia. From 1983 he worked at the City of Melbourne, going part time from 2020. He is a regular lecturer at RMIT and at the University of Melbourne, where he has been a Professorial Fellow since 2004. He runs his own consultancy, Adams Urban.

== Urban design in Melbourne ==
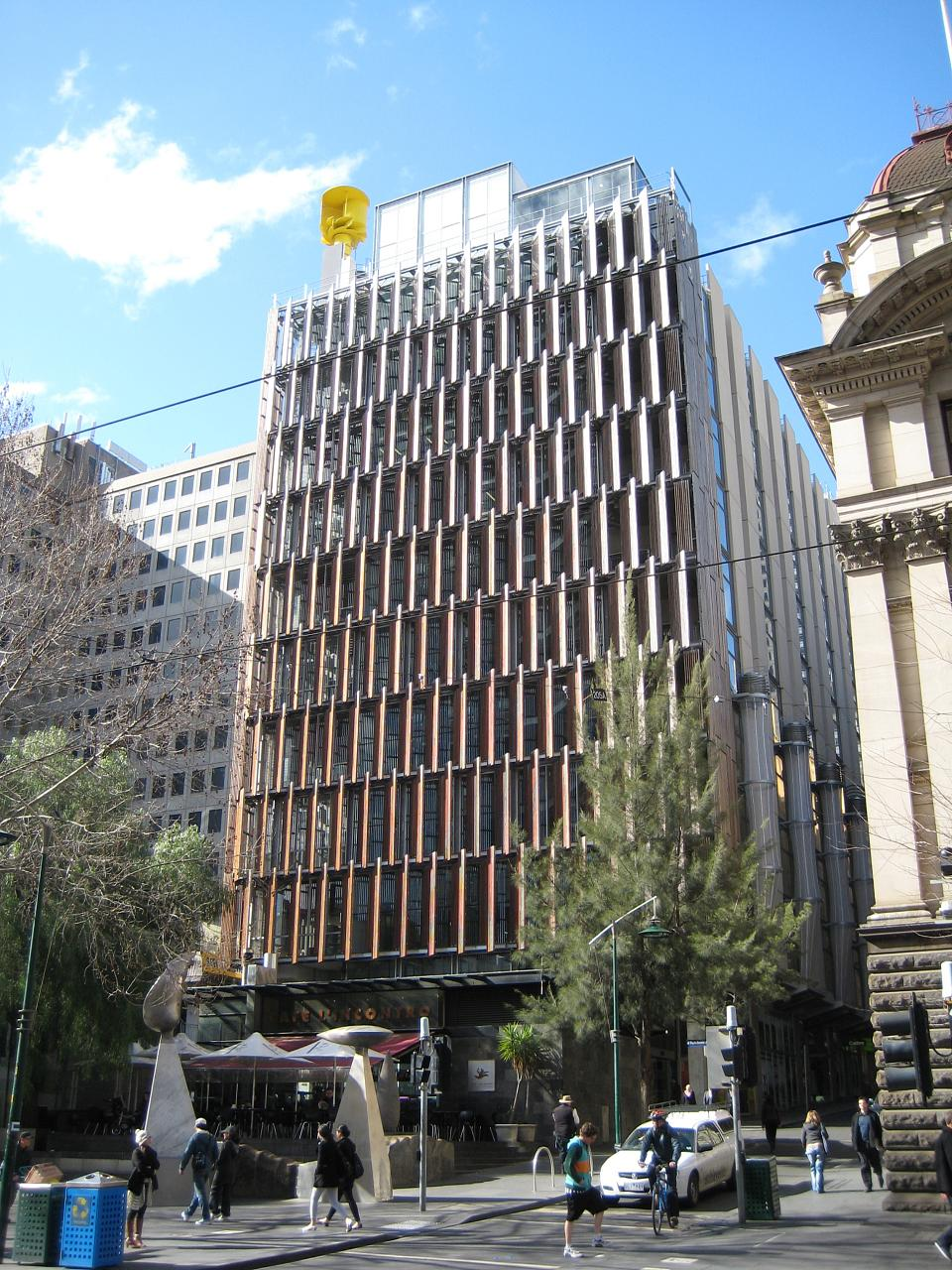
Council House 2 (CH_{2}), Melbourne

In 1985 the city centre of Melbourne was in need of revitalisation, with retail trading and cultural activities lagging behind its counterparts elsewhere in Australia and in Europe. Adams helped to write, and to put in place, the first comprehensive urban design strategy for the City, based on the idea of creating a vibrant and well-populated streetscape profiting from the city's multi-mode transport system. He guided the strategy's implementation in several projects, which took place as the city recovered from economic recession in the late 1980s and was prepared to invest in the built environment. These included Postcode 3000 (bringing redundant buildings into use, particularly for apartments in the city centre), the redevelopment of Swanston Street as a pedestrian-friendly street, the QV development, the creation of a new riverfront park called Birrarung Marr from under-used rail sidings, the Queensbridge Precinct, the Turning Basin, and the CH2 building which was the first purpose-built office building in Australia to achieve a maximum Six Green Star rating and which has passive heating and cooling, power generation and blackwater treatment. He has also overseen the installation of kilometres of detailed bluestone paving across the city, opened up laneways for retail use, redesigned the Yarra River frontage with walkways and new pedestrian bridges, installed street furniture and art, new lighting, signage and extensive tree planting.

Adams' urban revitalisation work in the urban core has assisted Melbourne to become one of the world's most liveable cities. Comprehensive urban design programs over two decades has seen a reversal in the way the city, and particularly its centre, is perceived. By the mid-1990s Melbourne was ranked highly in indices of desirable cities - as of 2010 Melbourne took second place in the 2010 Economist's World's Most Liveable Cities Index and rose to first in 2011, and second again in 2020. Adams has also promoted the arts and culture of Melbourne through projects such as Blue Line, Travellers, and Birrarung Wilam. He has expanded the City’s cultural program through venues such as ArtPlay (a venue for children's art and teaching activities), MeatMarket, ArtHouse and the Town Hall Gallery.

In the latter years of his tenure at the City of Melbourne he turned to accommodating over a million extra people within the existing metropolitan boundary. He advocated medium density, 5+storey development for housing and commercial uses along the major tram and bus corridors leading out of the centre, but only in locations with rear access to properties. Accommodating these numbers in new residential developments and existing suburbs would avoid further urban sprawl. Significant greening and reorientation of roadscapes would accompany these measures, which were outlined in the 'Transforming Cities' report of 2010. In 2020 he also argued the pandemic would leave central city office space also available for conversion for housing.

== Awards ==
- The City Design Division at the City of Melbourne led by Adams has received over 150 state and national awards for design excellence since the 1980s
- RAIA Walter Burley Griffin Award, Urban Design of Melbourne City, Urban Design Branch, City of Melbourne, 1992
- Order of Australia (AM) in 2007 for services to urban design, town planning and architecture.
- Melbourne Achiever Award, Committee for Melbourne, 2007
- Prime Minister's Environmentalist of the Year, 2008 (Australia)
- Sidney Luker Medal, Planning Institute of Australia NSW, 2009
- Australia Award for Urban Design for Transforming Cities report, 2009
- Honorary Doctorate, University of Melbourne, 2016
- Australian Institute of Architect’s National President’s Award, 2018
