= Open House =

Open House or Open house may refer to:

== Events ==
An open house is an event in which a building is open to the public.

Types of open houses include:

- Doors Open Days, allowing free access to buildings of historical or architectural interest not normally open to the public
- Open house (school), at a school
- Open House Chicago, an annual architecture festival in Chicago, Illinois, US
- Open House London, an annual architecture festival in London, UK
- Open House Brno, an annual architecture festival in Brno, Czech Republic
- Open house (LDS Church), a period when a Temple in The Church of Jesus Christ of Latter Day Saints is open to any member of the public to enter
- Open house, held by a volunteer fire department
- Open house, by a real estate agent to show a listed residential property to any interested parties; see real estate transaction

== Film ==
- Open House (1987 film), a horror film starring Joseph Bottoms
- Open House (2004 film), an independent film
- Open House (2010 film), a film starring Stephen Moyer
- Open House (2018 film), a Netflix film

== Literature ==
- Open House, a 1941 collection of poetry by Theodore Roethke
- Open House (novel), a 2000 novel by Elizabeth Berg

== Music ==
=== Albums ===
- Open House (album), a 1960 album by jazz organist Jimmy Smith
- Open House!, a 1963 album by jazz organist Johnny "Hammond" Smith
- Open House, a 1992 solo album by Irish folk fiddler Kevin Burke and the band that later took its name from the album
- Open House (EP), a 2007 EP by Jaci Velasquez

=== Other music ===
- Open House (band), a musical group led by Kevin Burke
- "Open House", a song by Lou Reed and John Cale on the 1990 album Songs for Drella

== Television ==
=== Episodes ===
- "Open Day", an episode of Yanks Go Home
- "Open House" (American Horror Story), a 2011 episode of the television show American Horror Story
- "Open House" (The Americans), a 2015 episode of the television show The Americans
- "Open House" (Breaking Bad), a 2011 episode of Breaking Bad
- "Open House" (Pee-wee's Playhouse), a 1987 episode of Pee-wee's Playhouse

=== Series ===
- Open House (1957 TV series), a 1957 Australian television series
- Open House (1964 TV series), a 1964 British series that aired on BBC
- Open House (1989 TV series), a 1989–1990 American sitcom that aired on Fox
- Open House (2007 TV program), a 2007-present American luxury real estate program produced by LXTV and aired on NBC
- Open House (2009 TV program) or Your Bottom Line, a 2009–2010 CNN weekend financial news program
- Open House (Canadian TV series), a 1952 Canadian television series
- Open House (Irish TV programme), an Irish daytime chat show
- Open House with Gloria Hunniford, a UK daytime chat show

== Other uses ==
- Open House (FP7), a project launched by the European Seventh Framework Program
- Jerusalem Open House, an Israeli gay rights organisation
- Open House (Australia), a live talkback Christian radio show

== See also ==
- European Heritage Days
