= Open House Tel Aviv =

Open House Tel Aviv בתים מבפנים
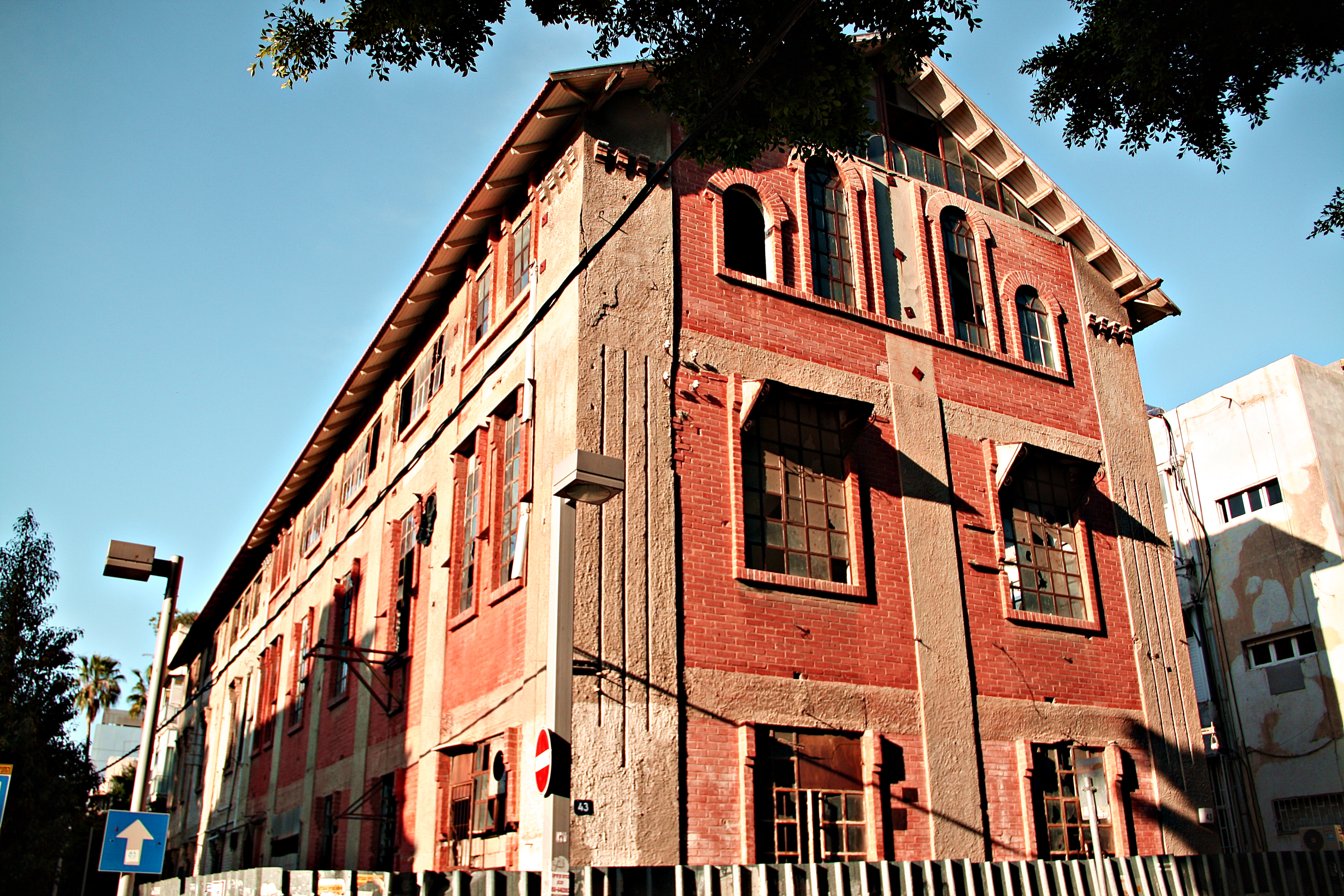
- Łodzia House, one of the buildings that was opened to the public in 2010
- Status: Active
- Genre: Architecture, Cultural Event
- Frequency: Annually
- Venue: Various buildings and landmarks in Tel Aviv
- Location: Tel Aviv
- Country: Israel

Open House Tel Aviv (Batim MiBifnim, lit. "Houses From Within") happens over the course of a weekend annually in Tel Aviv, Israel, in which different buildings, landmarks and private residences open their doors to the general public to offer a free glimpse of architecture in the past and present, with a preview of design for the future. It is one of many Open House events that take place in cities such as London and New York City, originally started in France in 1984.

== See also ==
- openhousenewyork
- Open House London
- Doors Open Toronto
- Doors Open Canada
