= Manchester Curious =

Local architectural event in Manchester

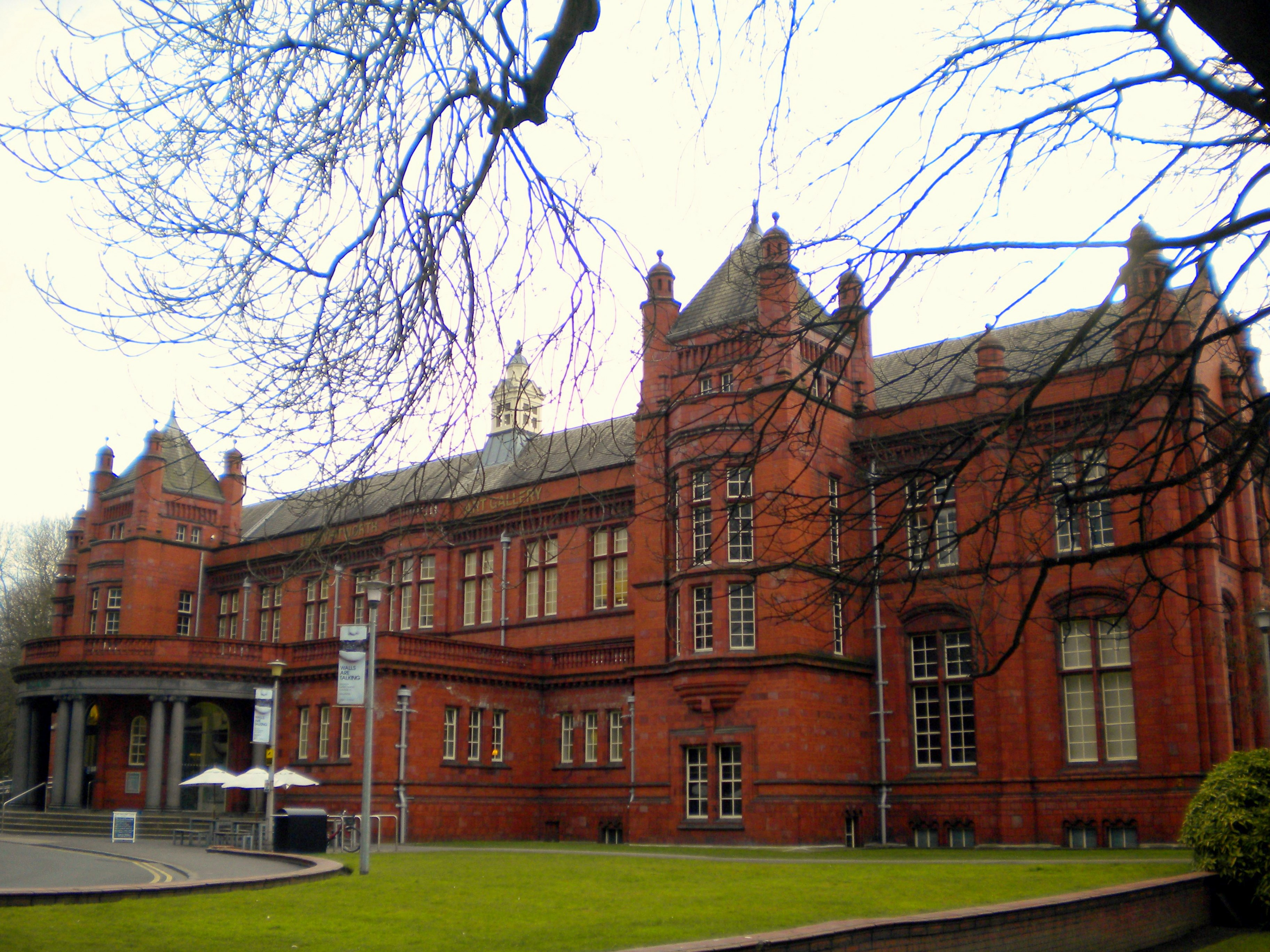
Whitworth Gallery one of the most popular events in 2015

Manchester Curious is an event which promotes appreciation of architecture in Manchester by the general public. It is inspired by similar Open-City events and first appeared in Manchester in October 2015. Heritage Open Days is a similar event covering the rest of England, and takes place the previous month to Manchester Curious.

The Manchester Curious is usually held in early October.

Manchester Curious differs to other open house events as it charges a nominal fee for each event, rather than providing a brochure that gives access (as in London).

== See also ==
- Historic Houses Association
- Open House London
- Doors Open Days
- Treasure Houses of England
