= Open House Brno =

Open House Brno (OHB) is a free weekend festival held annually in Brno that allows participants to visit dozens of buildings that are not typically open to the public. Every visit is free of charge. It is part of a worldwide network of Open House events, that started with Open House London in 1992, in 2003 followed Open House New York and other cities as for example later in 2011 Open House Chicago.

== Edition 2018 ==
For the first full scale event in 2018, 23 locations participated, and event attracted around 8,000 people.

== Edition 2019 ==
Second year of the event in 2019 was attended in person by Victoria Thornton, founder of Open House Worldwide. Included were Educational workshops "Human Ant-hill," a special program for children – architectural-learning fun – and there are also guided tours for English and German speaking visitors. The festival leads architecture fans, not only through the city centre, where doors to the former Moravian Parliament and the renovated palaces and villas will be thrown open, but also to the more remote parts of the city. There are civil engineering structures, residential structures and industrial buildings with an panoramatic view or a unique design.

== Edition 2020 ==
The COVID-19 pandemic has limited personal attendance possibilities, thus the online version of the festival was performed on 23–24 April 2020. The Autumn edition was presented as the spring festival replacement. Once again was realized solely online 10–11 October 2020

Filming and Workshops were prepared by a group of volunteers and students from Masaryk and Mendel Universities. Results were published on YouTube channel and Facebook. The industrial focus was emphasized e.g. presented was Edison’s power station, which was used for the first European electrified Theatre. One of the most popular recordings was Dada district residential lofts

Virtual visits were enabled to almost 50 locations across the city. There were presented pre-recorded guided tours, panoramas, 3D walks and 360 walks. Streaming gained quite positive reviews, about 14ts views on Facebook and about 6ts views on freshly established Youtube channel. Traditional entry was enabled only to restricted groups of volunteers.

Open House Brno participated on Open House Worldwide online festival, 48 hours over the weekend of 14–15 November. OHB presented section Spiritual places, for which were prepared Brno Synagogue and Rainbow jewel is Catholic Church of Maria Restituta Kafka, consecrated just in September 2020. The event had widespread media attention.

== Edition 2022 ==
87 locations opened on Saturday 28th and Sunday 29th May 2022. 40 additional buildings which had to remain closed, were introduced by online tours. Annual special theme was “Old and New”; a comparison and contrast of socialist realism and brutalist architecture with contemporary modern buildings. Locations of the program were presented by a seven-kilometer-long bike tour.

Special tours oriented on children were at the premises of Park Railway and durinwg sundown on the grounds of villa Tugendhat on Saturday and villa Löw Beer on Sunday. The program “Enjoy the villa untraditionally” offered both representative halls and otherwise inaccessible spaces with a torch in hand The event recorded 21967 visitors in 2022.

== Edition 2023 ==
OHB offered several dozen tours focusing on female creation in Brno architecture. Annual theme was introduced by an exibiion "Architects and their works of 60´-80´", to look at the creation in the period of socialism in the reality of the period, but without the ideological flair and optics of the then active, often budding female creators. Most attended was look out tower of pallion G at Brno fairgrounds, recording 3329 visitors. Popular were events at vila Tugendhat and Kristek house, favoured by timing, but also active additions by building themselves - music production, theatre performance, open garden with commented tours by garden architects. In total there were 110 locations

== Structure ==
Open House Brno is organized by nonprofit organization Spolek Culture&Management. In the years 2017 – 2020 was main partner TIC Brno.

== Gallery ==
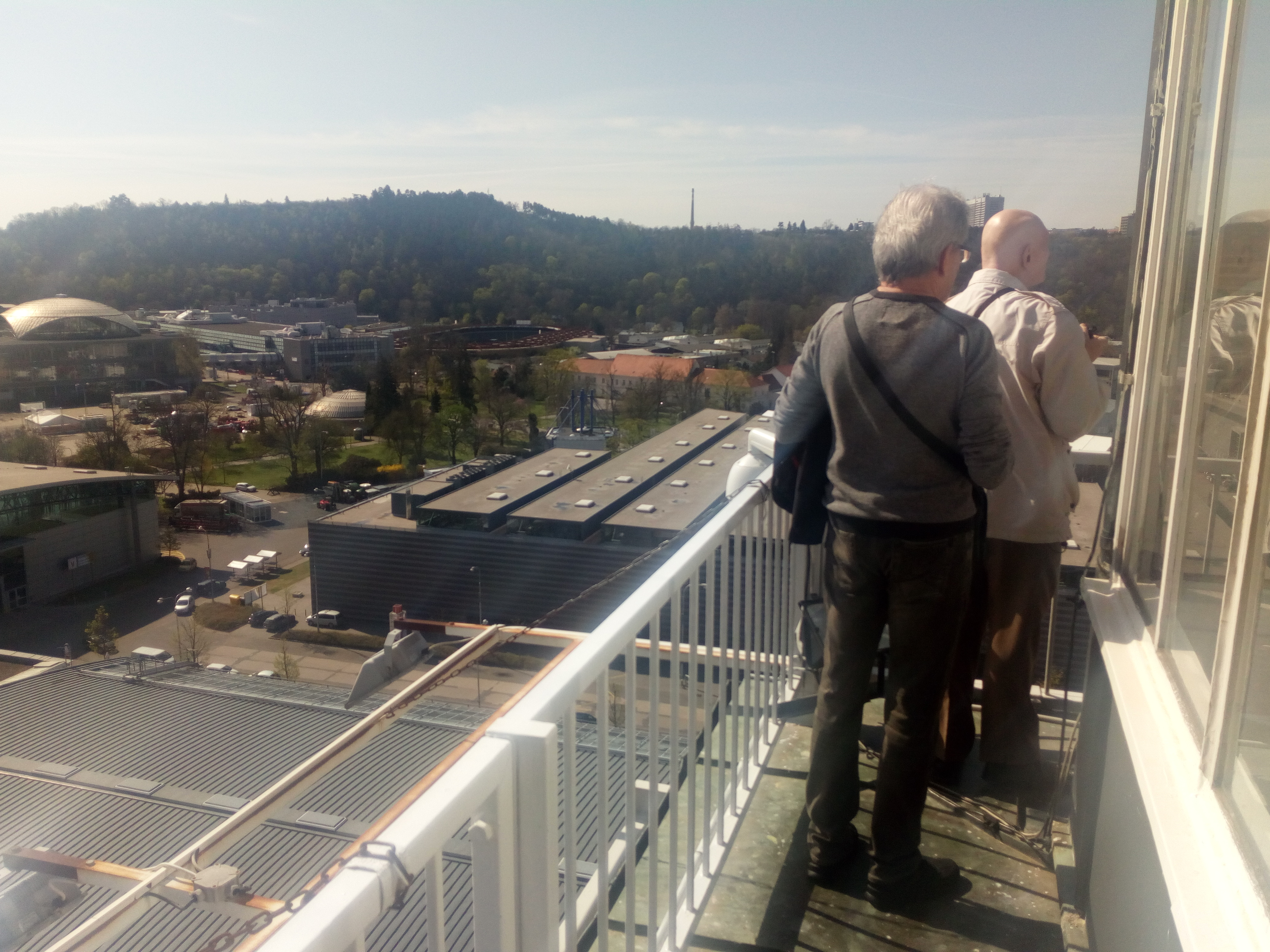
Visitors of Open House Brno at BVV Trade Fairs Brno view tower, 2018

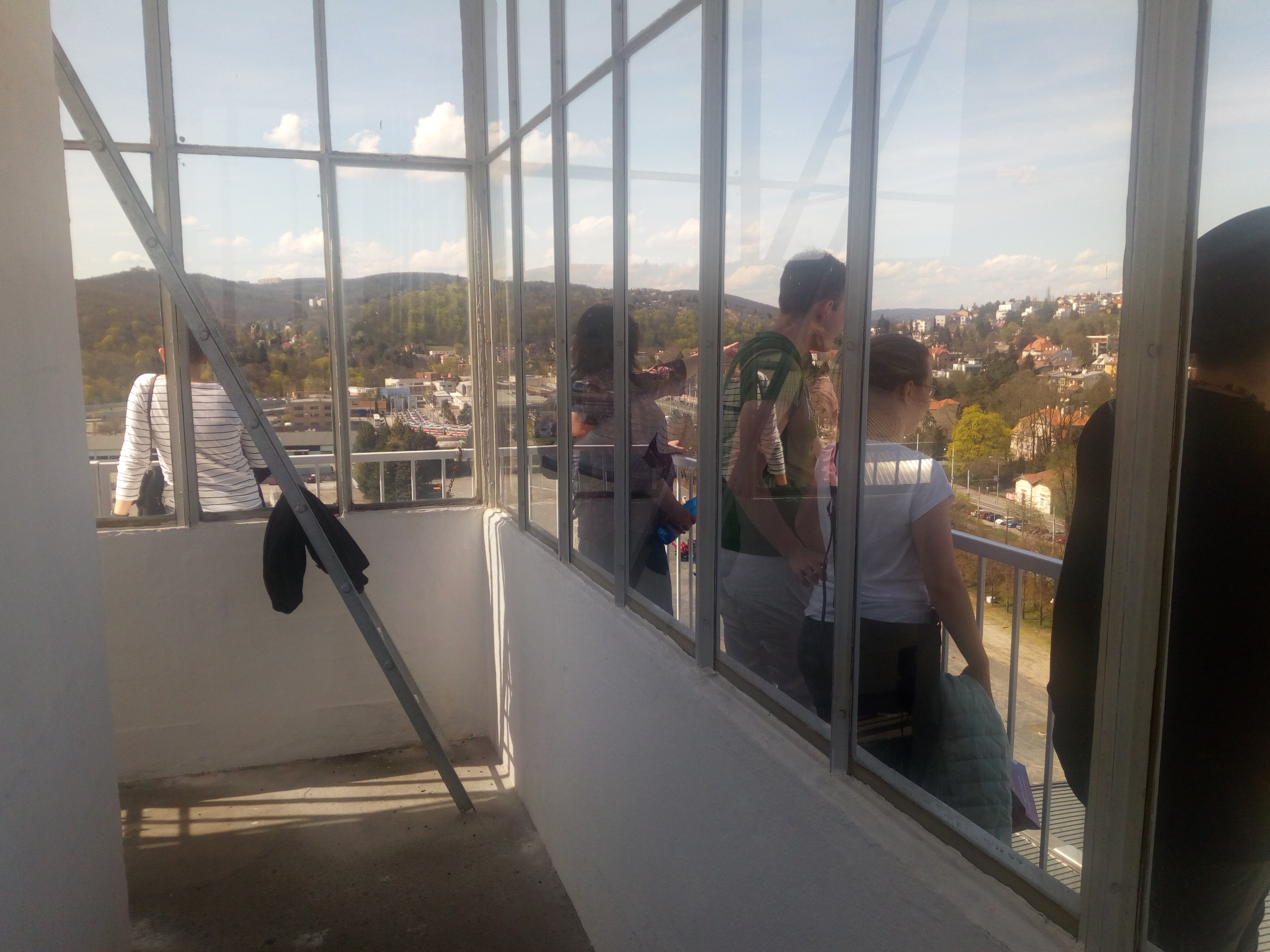
Visitors of Open House Brno at BVV Trade Fairs Brno view tower, 2018

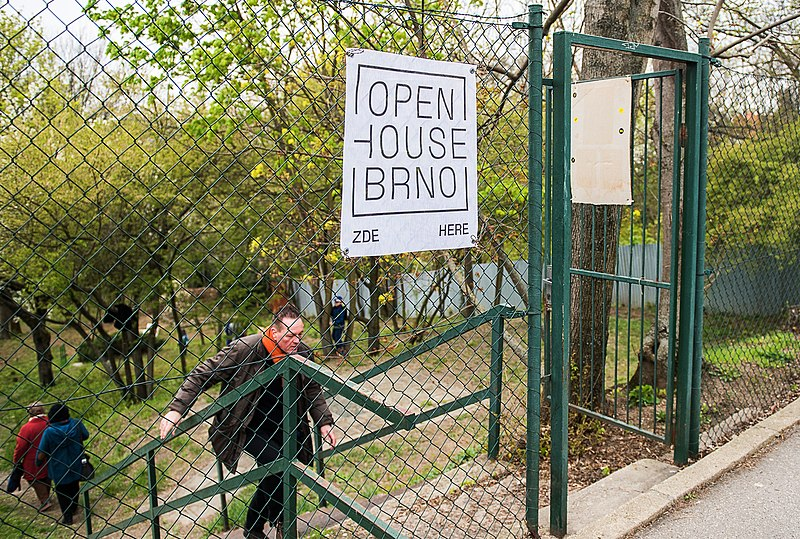
Visitors of Open House Brno at Arnoldova vila Memorial, 2019

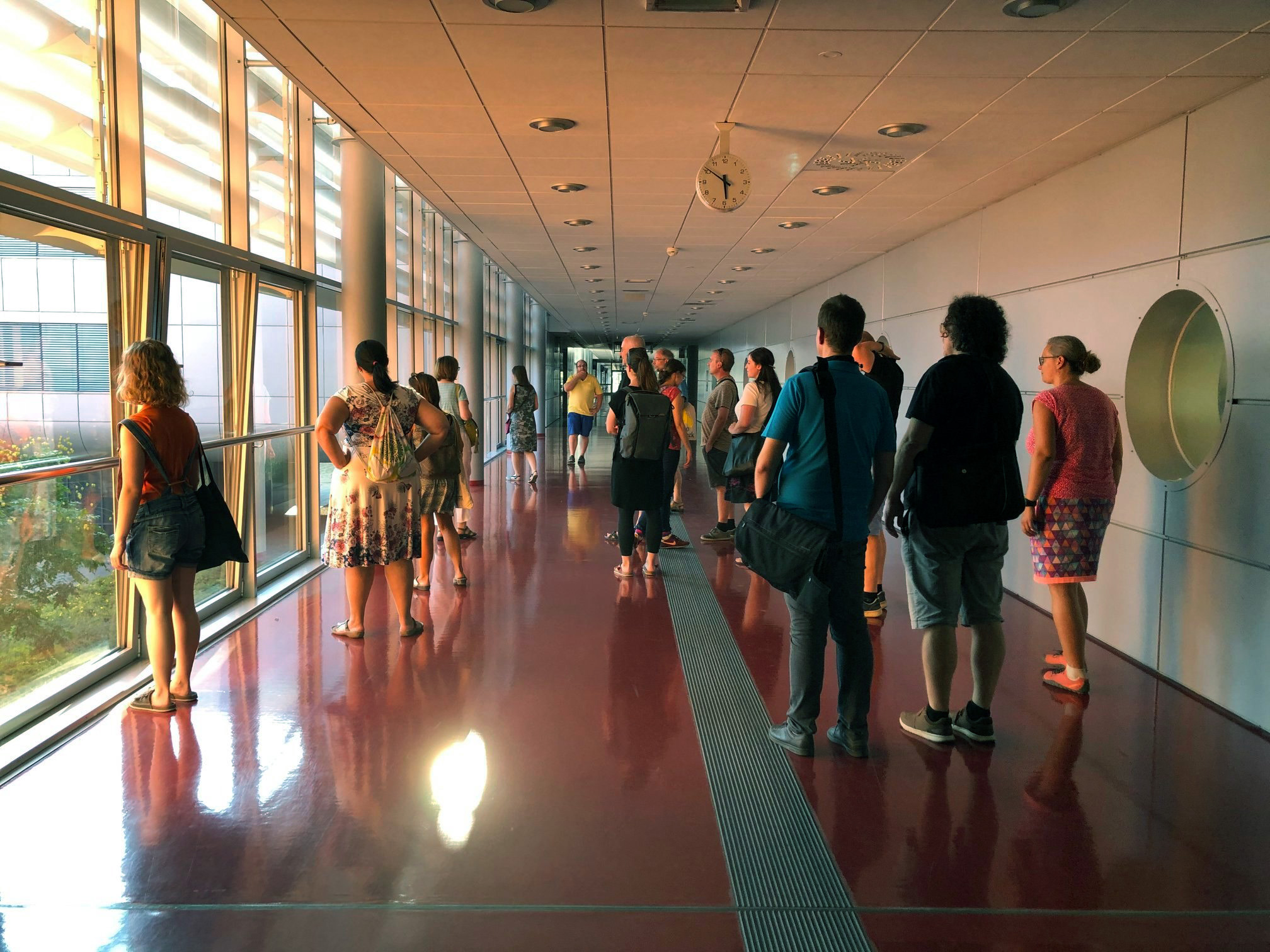
Visitors of Open House Brno at Masaryk Univezity Campus, 2020
