= Archtober =

Archtober is a citywide celebration of architecture in New York City organized by the Center for Architecture. The festival's name is a portmanteau of architecture and October, the month in which it is celebrated.

The festival is known for its Building of the Day highlight, which provides a focus on a specific building or architect thereof, but also includes exhibits and other public programs that celebrate architecture and design.

== See also ==
- Open House New York
