= Night of Culture =

Night of Culture (Noc Kultury in Polish) is a culture night held annually in the city of Lublin, Poland. During this night people are allowed to attend, late into the night, theater plays, classical, popular, gospel and folk music concerts, exhibitions, film showings or street happenings, free of charge. Visitors are allowed to access among other things any cultural institution in the city such as underground basements or the cathedral tower. All night long people can party in clubs from all over the city.

== History ==
Leszek Hadrian the head of Musical Theater in Lublin was the first one to come up with the idea of the Night of Culture. He claimed it to be a 'demonstration of culture'. Apart from that, the Night of Culture was an opportunity and help at the same time for Lublin in achieving the title of 2016 European Capital of Culture. To date, many of the artistic and community centres in the city have joined the Night of Culture. Night of Culture should not be mistaken for the Long Night of Museums. The Night of Museums is a separate event which takes place in many different cities in Poland, whereas the Night of Culture is unique and takes place only in Lublin. Both events are held on various dates.

- The first night of culture took place in 2007, 70 institutions participated and it embraced 80 events.
- The second edition was much more prestigious and involved 100 institutions and included 150 events
- The third edition in June 2009 was held under the name “Man in city – City in man”. The events took place on the streets which created a man's silhouette from a bird's eye view. 100 institutions took part and 250 events were held.

All editions were financed by the town council and the first edition was additionally sponsored by the Minister of Culture and National Heritage who donated a sum of 25,000 zlotys.

== Awards ==
- Grand Prix of Culture (organised by Gazeta Wyborcza) in 2007 for the best cultural event of the year
- VI place in the plebiscite organised by the Media of Lublin in 2008
- III place in the contest for the Best Tourist Product in 2009
