= Vilnius Culture Night =

Culture Night, or Kulturos Naktis, is a culture night in Vilnius, Lithuania. This festival occurs annually in June or July. Nearly a hundred and fifty various cultural events fill the spaces of Vilnius art meccas and open areas.. The Culture Night has been around since 2007. Festival initiator is Daina Urbanavičienė. Vilnius was a European Capital of Culture in 2009, and the organising committee managed subsequent editions of the culture night.

The night attracts more than 100,000 visitors not only from the capital city, but also from other towns or countries. Up to 150 projects are presented by over 1000 cultural organizations and about 500 artists. In this night, the squares, parks, small courtyards, terraces and most unexpected spaces of the city are flooded by presentations and events of different kinds, and art projects. People are invited to not only to look, but also to participate, and to stroll around the city museums, galleries, churches, concert halls, theatres and workshops. In Culture Night the doors of Vilnius museums, galleries, theatres and churches are open to visitors.
