= Chicago Architecture Center =

American nonprofit cultural organization

Coordinates: 41.88792°N 87.623668°W

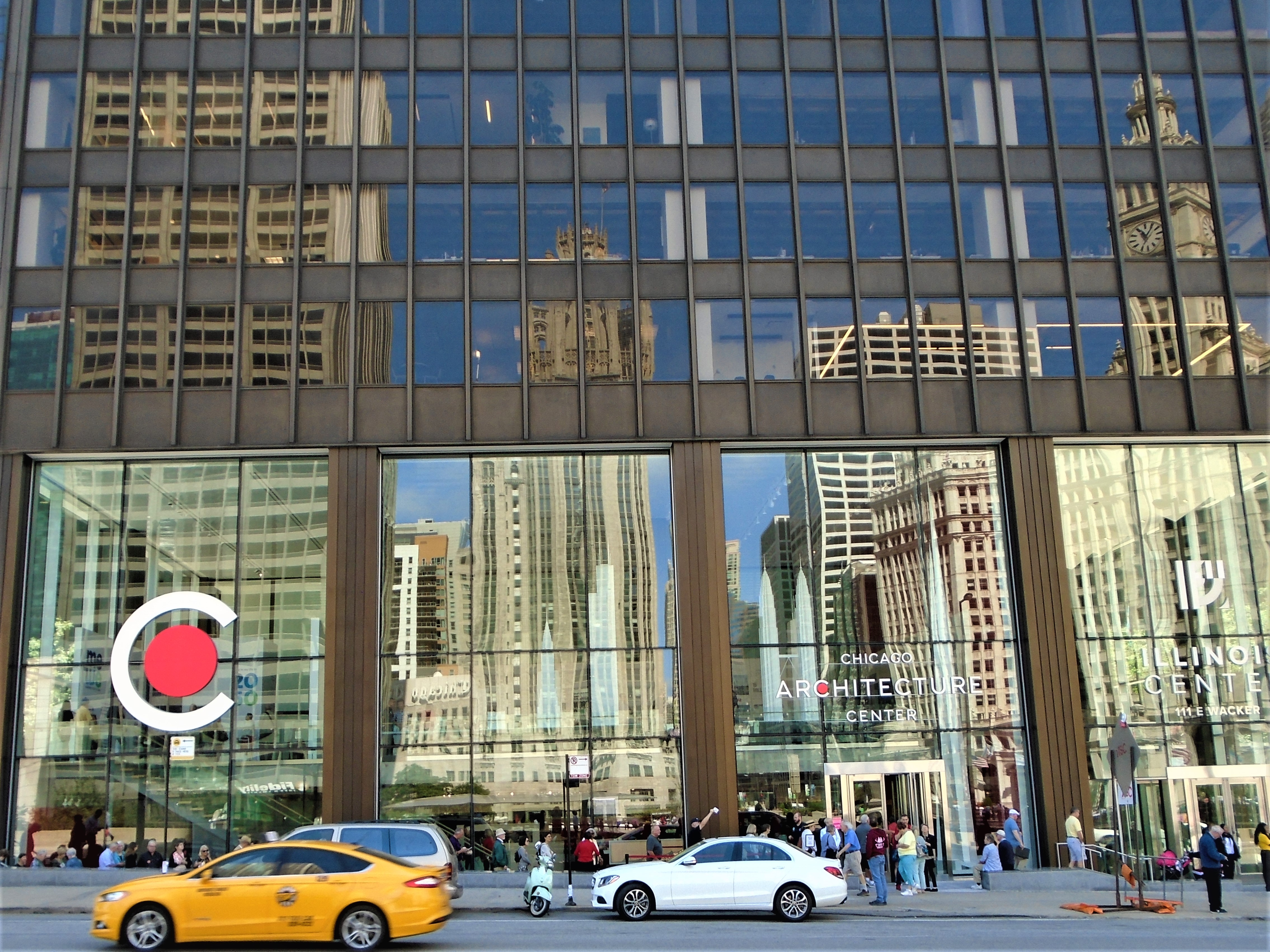
- Chicago Architecture Center headquarters
- Founded: 1966
- Type: 501(c)(3) charitable organization
- Purpose: Education, Architecture, Design
- Location: Chicago, Illinois, U.S.
- Members: 11,000
- Volunteers: 1,000
- Website: architecture.org

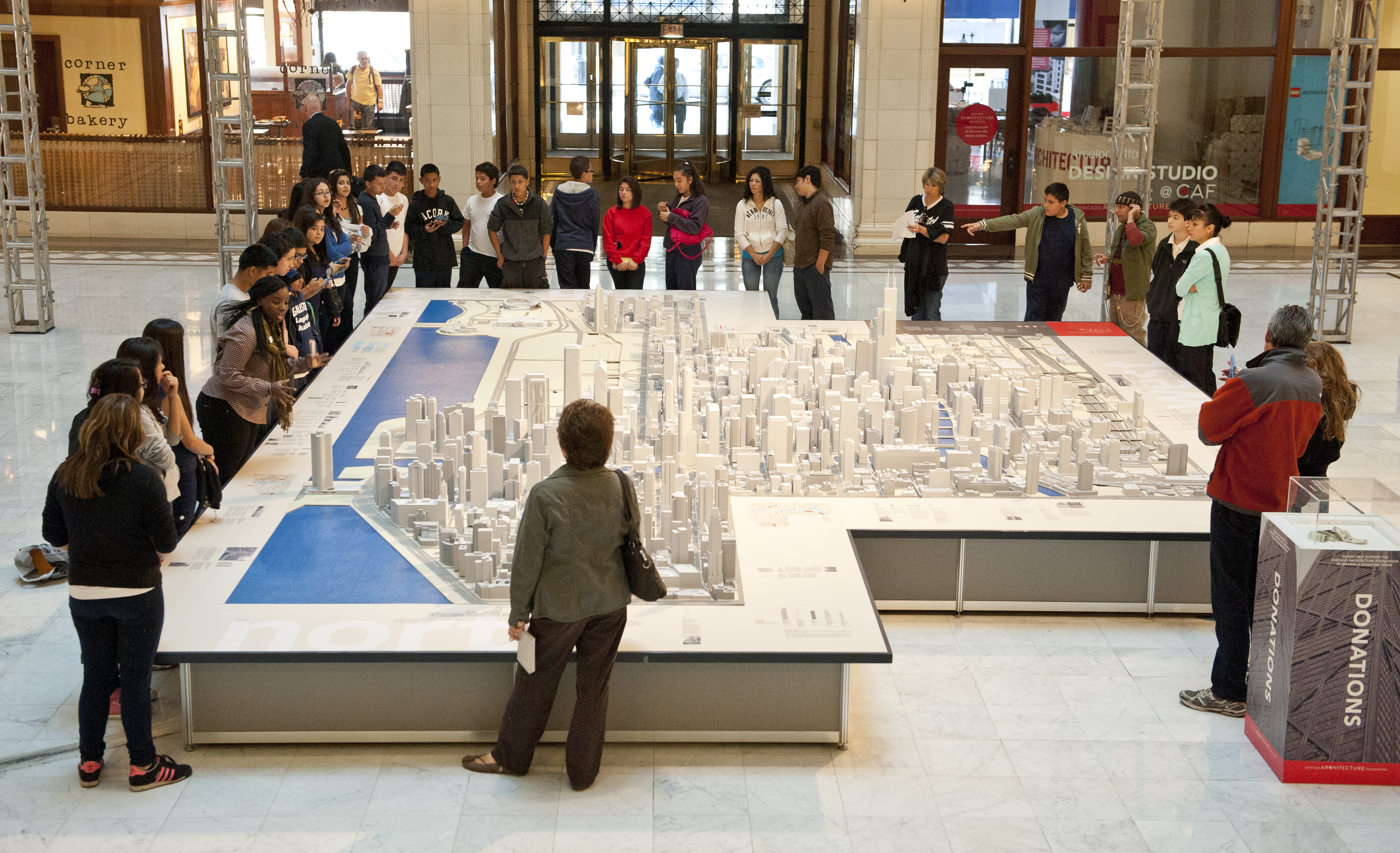
Chicago Model in 2014

The Chicago Architecture Center (CAC), formerly the Chicago Architecture Foundation, is a nonprofit cultural organization based in Chicago, Illinois, United States, whose mission is to showcase Chicago and ideas from cities worldwide to inspire better living through design. Founded in 1966, its programs include public tours and programs, most notably the docent-led architecture cruise on the Chicago River, and other tours in the Chicago area. The river cruise is ranked in the top ten tours in the U.S. by TripAdvisor users. CAC includes conference and exhibition space, including a scale model of downtown Chicago.

== History ==
The CAC was founded in 1966 as the Chicago School of Architecture Foundation to save H. H. Richardson's Glessner House, one of Chicago's oldest residences. In 1971, it began to offer lectures and volunteer-led tours of Chicago to the public. It was renamed the Chicago Architecture Foundation in 1979, and CAF later moved into the Railway Exchange Building on Michigan Avenue in 1992 with an expanded book store and program space.

CAC and the American Architectural Foundation co-founded the Association of Architecture Organizations in 2005, a now international membership group that develops the programs and work of public architecture education groups. In 2009, the center opened a new exhibition, Chicago Model, which includes a 3D-printed scale model of the central area of the city and is now on permanent display. Changing its name to the Chicago Architecture Center, it moved to a newly expanded space in Mies van der Rohe's One Illinois Center at 111 E. Wacker Dr. on the Chicago River in August 2018.

== Tours ==
As of 2022, the CAC offers approximately 85 different tours of the city. All tours are led by trained volunteer docents who go through a 14-week training course before being certified to lead CAC tours. Many tours in the Loop include historic buildings such as the Chicago Board of Trade, the Marquette Building, the Monadnock Building, and Daniel Burnham and John Wellborn Root's Rookery among many others. Some modern buildings that are explored include the Sears Tower, John Hancock Center, Mies van der Rohe's Chicago Federal Center and the Trump Tower. The CAC also offers tours of parks and public spaces such as Millennium Park, Maggie Daley Park and the Chicago Pedway. During the summer months, the CAC offers tours of various neighborhoods throughout Chicago in addition to downtown tours. The CAC's most popular tour, the CAFC River Cruise aboard Chicago's First Lady Cruises has departures April–November every year. The CAC offers other tours year-round.

== Exhibitions ==
Permanent exhibitions include The Legacy of Wrigley Field, and The Chicago City Model Experience. Beginning in June of 2026, the CAC will open two new exhibitions. Flyway City: Architecture for a Flourishing Ecosystem, designed and co-curated with Studio Gang, will reveal "how people can take action to create healthier urban habitats and save birds from colliding with building glass." A companion exhibit, Chicago’s Living Habitat, also involves Openlands and underscores the connection between urban life and the surrounding eco-systems.

== Open House Chicago ==
The CAC also hosts the largest annual architecture event in the city, Open House Chicago. This free, annual event gives the public access to buildings and spaces around the city that are typically closed to the public. Held over a weekend in October, Open House Chicago attracts tens of thousands of participants from around the world.

== Education ==
The CAC offers a robust architecture and design education program and has received several awards for their curricula and textbooks including Schoolyards to Skylines, the Architecture Handbook, and DiscoverDesign.org. In 2013, the CAC opened the ArcelorMittal Design Studio, a studio space dedicated to introducing design concepts to individuals of all ages.

== CAC Store ==
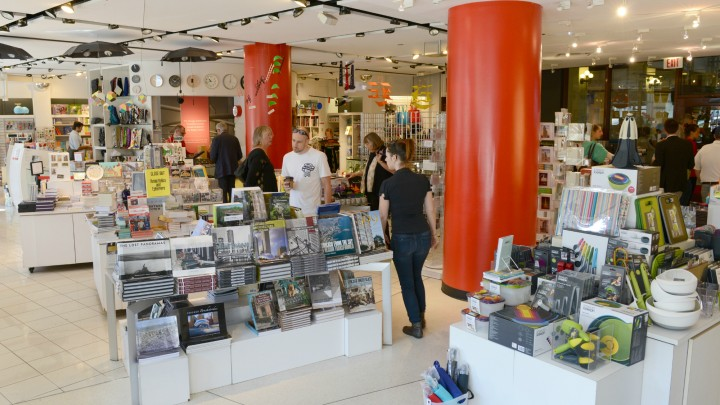
CAC Shop

The CAC Store, which offers Chicago and architecture-themed products, is located on the first floor of the Chicago Architecture Center at 111 E. Wacker Dr.
