= Culture night =

Annual evening of open houses and events

A Culture Night is an annual event where the museums and cultural spaces in a city or country which usually close by the late afternoon remain open into the late-night, and public buildings such as fire stations or post offices, hold doors open evenings. Special performances may also be organised for the night.

== Europe ==
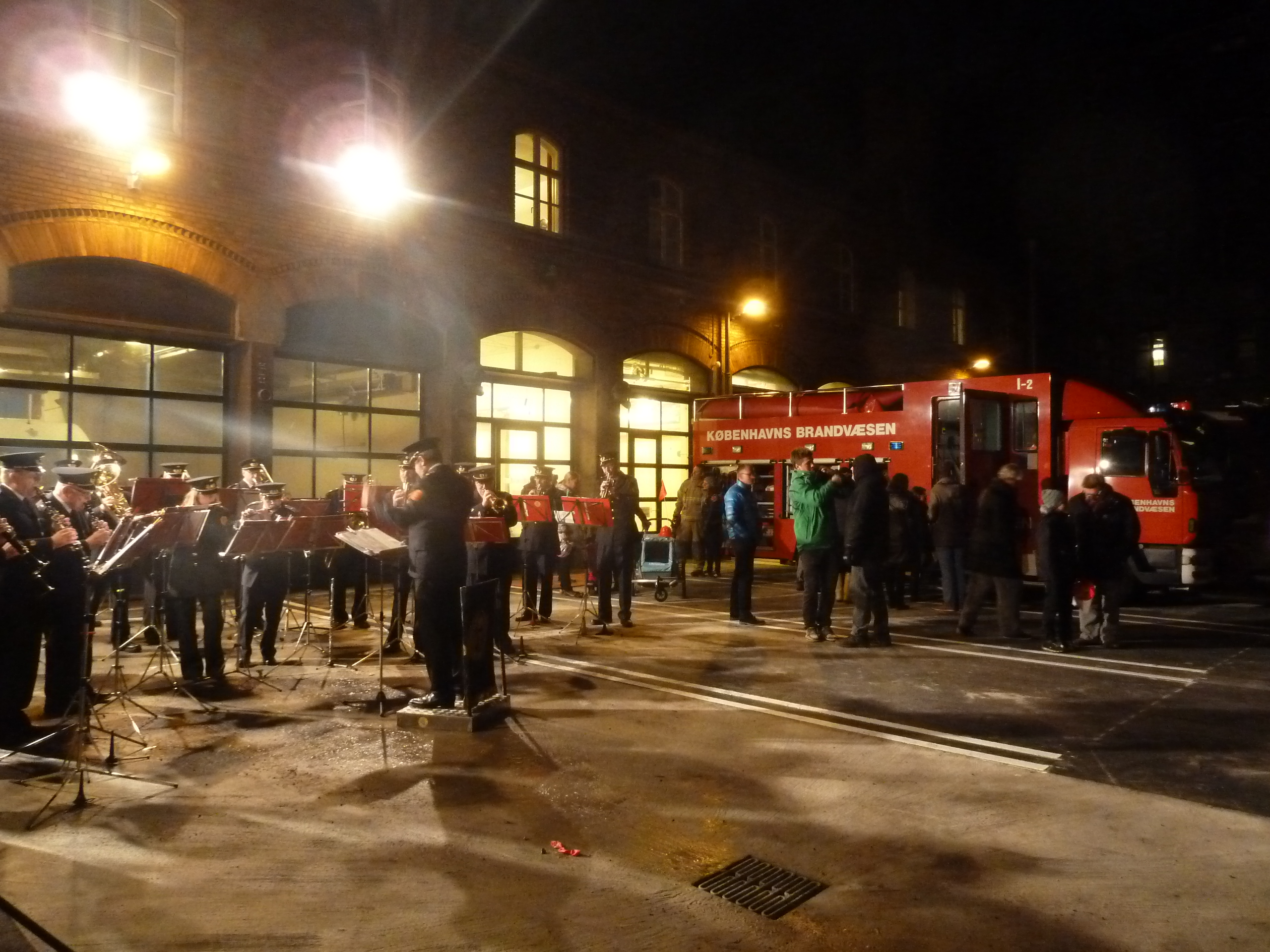
Open house at the Copenhagen Fire Department during Culture Night 2012

National Culture nights have taken place in Denmark, Germany, Austria, and Norway. Starting in Dublin in 2006, Culture Night (Ireland) has taken place each September since 2007. Lublin, Poland hosts Night of Culture every June. Vilnius Culture Night is held each June or July. Oslo Culture Night is held each September.

=== Sweden ===
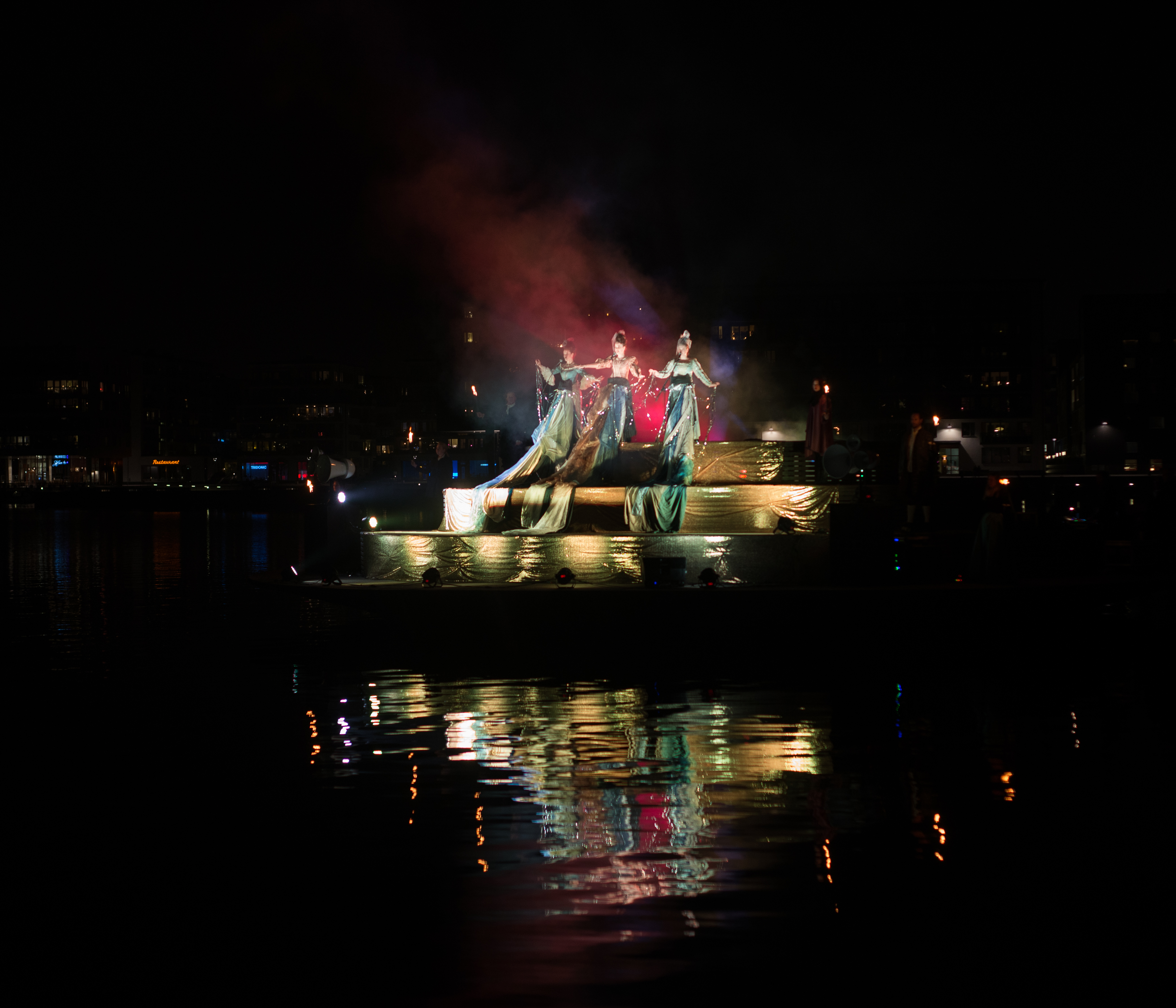
Opera students from the Kulturama school perform outdoors in Hammarby Sjöstad during Stockholm's Culture Night 2015.

Culture nights in do not occur on the same night nationwide. Lund's Culture Night began in 1985, and happens in September. Uppsala and Luleå's also happen in September, while Örebro and Gothenburg's occurs in October, and Stockholm's take place in April.

== See also ==
- Nuit Blanche, a similar event in which public spaces also become de facto galleries
- Doors Open Days, in which venues open up normally restricted areas to the public
