= Open House London =

Annual festival

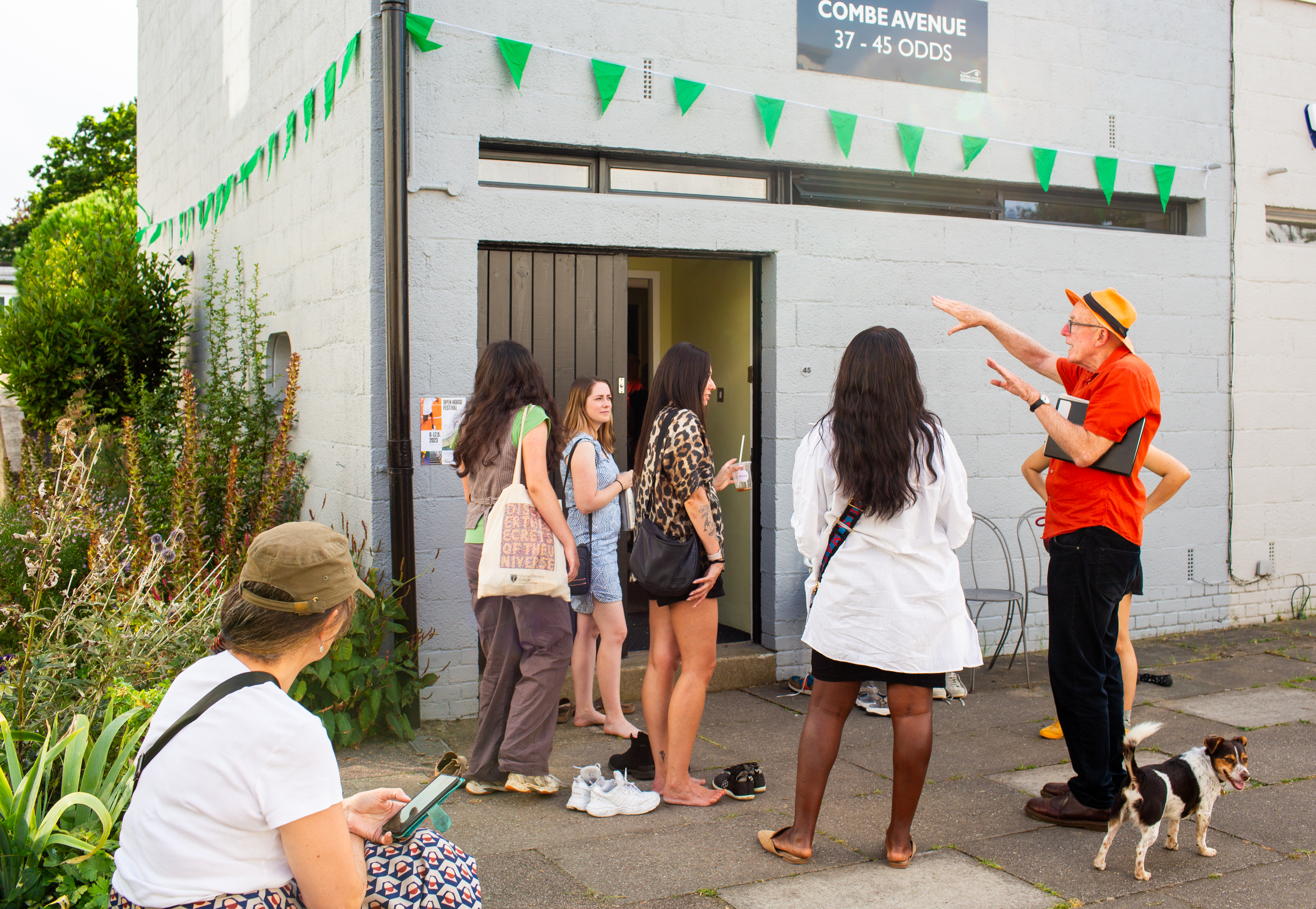
An open day at Vanbrugh Park Estate taking place during Open House Festival 2023

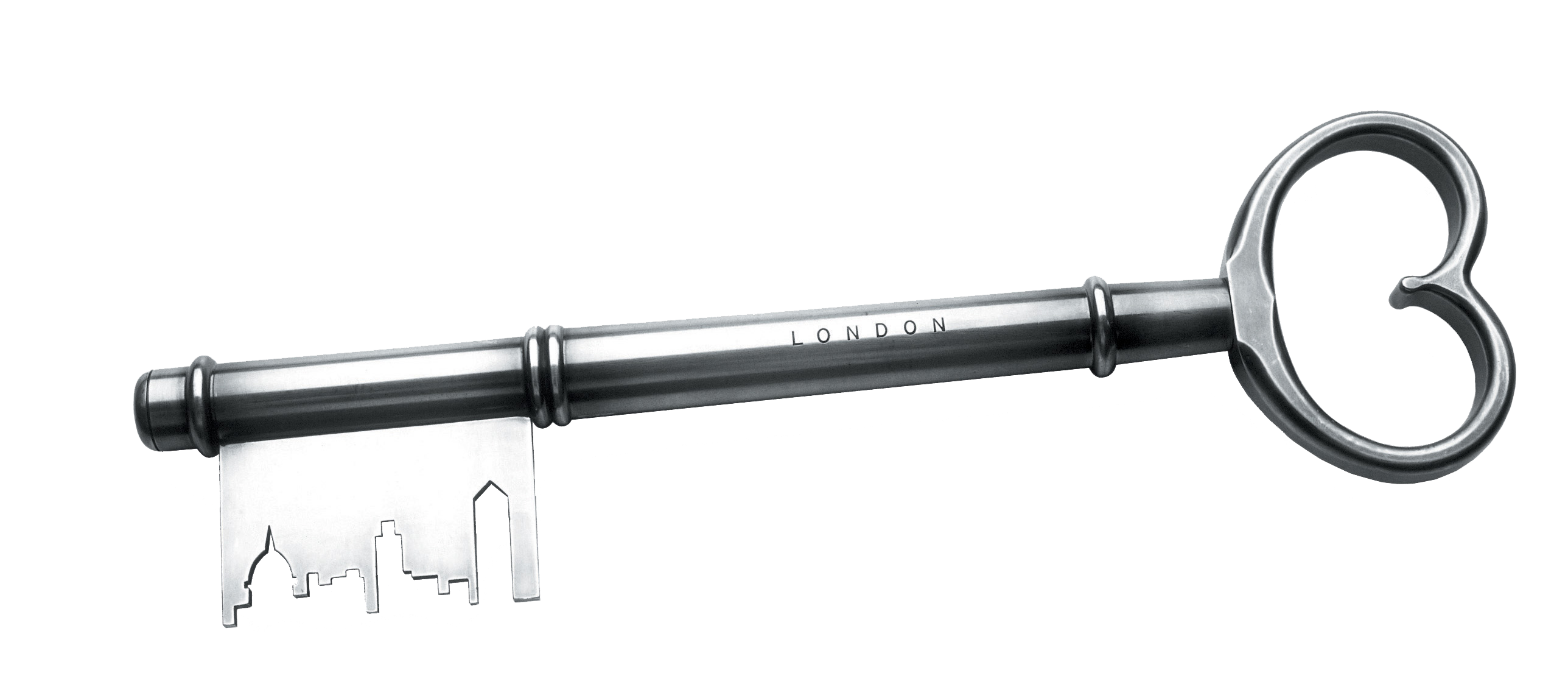
A silver key with the word "London" etched in its side and a blade in the shape of the London skyline. Used by the festival Open House and its parent charity, Open City.

Open House London, now known as Open House Festival, is an annual festival celebrating the architecture and urban landscape of London. It is staged by the charity Open City which campaigns to make London a more accessible, equitable and open city. Starting in London in 1992 the festival has spread to over 60 of cities across the world. During the Open House Festival, many buildings considered to be of architectural significance open their doors for free public tours.

The 2019 event featured over 800 buildings, neighbourhood walks, architects' talks, cycle tours, and more. Well-known buildings not usually open to the public which were open on Open House weekend in 2005, for example, included Marlborough House, Lancaster House, Mansion House, the Foreign and Commonwealth Office, and Horse Guards.

Outside of the Open House festival, Open City organises other projects including year-round tours, lectures and educational events for children and young people.

== The Open House key ==
The Open House festival uses a key as its emblem; the blade formed in the shape of London's skyline.

== Notable people ==
- Victoria Thornton, inaugural director
- Phineas Harper, Chief Executive (2020-2024)

== See also ==
- Historic Houses Association
- Open House New York
- Open House Chicago
- Open House Brno
- Doors Open Days
- Treasure Houses of England
- Manchester Curious
- Visit My Mosque
