= Doors Open Pittsburgh =

DOORS OPEN Pittsburgh
- Founded: 2016
- Purpose: Nonprofit offering tours of historical buildings and new spaces
- Headquarters: Pittsburgh, PA
- Founder/Executive Director: Bonnie Baxter
- Website: www.doorsopenpgh.org

DOORS OPEN Pittsburgh (DOP) is a nonprofit organization based in Pittsburgh, Pennsylvania, giving tours into the city's historical buildings and new spaces. The events organized by DOP include a walking tour, bus tours, virtual storytelling, and special annual event.

== History ==
DOORS OPEN Pittsburgh (DOP) was founded in 2016 by Pittsburgh resident Bonnie Baxter after she had attended a similar tour in Open House Chicago. The 2017 5,200 people participated in the tour.

DOP's first Annual Event (AE) in 2016 attracted over 3,000 visitors into 39 historic, commercial, residential, and government buildings in Downtown Pittsburgh. With that event, Pittsburgh became one of the 40+ cities with "doors open/open house" events around the world, including New York, Toronto, and Paris. In early 2019, DOP introduced bus tours, and since then, DOP added a number of tours and event concepts to its educational programming. A number of the DOORS OPEN Pittsburgh tours are dedicated to stories of minority groups, including the LGBTQ community, the Jewish community, and the BIPOC community. Other events feature the "quirky side of Pittsburgh" with stories of "cemeteries, public art installations, and long-forgotten performance venues".

As of 2021, more than 16,000 tour goers have attended a DOORS OPEN Pittsburgh event.

== Mission statement ==
The mission statement of DOORS OPEN Pittsburgh is to encourage the appreciation of Pittsburgh's architectural design, history and art. The tours are dedicated to both Pittsburgh's sites and its regional landmarks, covering arts, architecture, and cultural heritage, alongside its multiple industrial Renaissances.
