= Victoria Thornton =

British architect and civic activist

- Occupation: Architect
- Known for: Founder of the Open House architecture

Victoria Thornton OBE HonFRIBA is a British architect. She is the founder of the Open House architecture concept which has sought to improve public engagement in architecture and urban design.

In 1992, Thornton founded the architecture education charity Open-City and the initiatives Open House London and, later, Open House Worldwide. The Open House initiative emphasizes the importance of design in creating livable cities and the role everyone plays in shaping them through conversations with key stakeholders and the general public. From 2018-22, she has been president of the Architectural Association School of Architecture, London; is the founder of Thornton Education Trust; trustee and chair, Architecture and Planning Committee Bath Preservation Trust; Director of Architecture for Kids and Member of Learning and Research Committee, Design Museum.

== Early career ==
Victoria Thornton began her career as editor of the RIBA London Annual Review, and as a producer of international study programmes, as well as a freelance producer and advisor to architectural practices. She was also (from 1994) Director of the first formal RIBA Architecture Centre, developing lecture programmes and international exhibitions.

With Kenneth Allinson, she has co-authored since 1994 several editions of the Guide to London's Contemporary Architecture.

== Open House and Open-City ==
In 1992, Thornton founded the charity Open House (later renamed Open-City) in London to enable people outside the profession to have a better understanding of architecture and urban design. The Open House initiative seeks to showcase outstanding architecture for all to experience, free of charge, and to invite everyone to explore, debate and advocate for the value of a well-designed built environment. The first programme in 1992 featured 20 buildings, that in 1994 over 200 and as an annual event in September it has more recently expanded to over 800 buildings. The concept has now been taken up by over 45 cities globally, which together constitute the Open House Worldwide 'family'.

As well as being Director of Open-City and Open House (1992–2016), Thornton also developed and chaired programmes to engage young people and decision-makers in issues around quality in the built environment, including Adopt a School, Architecture in Schools, London Exemplar for Planning Councillors, Summer Architecture Academy and My City Too!. She also created Art in the Open as London's strategy agency for art in the public realm with funding from Arts Council England.

== Appointments ==
Among the positions Victoria Thornton has held are:

- Trustee and Board Member of the Architectural Association
- Jury Member of the RIBA Royal Gold Medal (2015–17)
- Board Member of Irish Architecture Foundation (2005–13)
- Department of Culture, Media and Sport's Engaging Places Advisory Panel (2007)
- expert advisory panel, Farrell Review of Architecture and the Built Environment

In October 2018 Victoria Thornton was ratified as President and Chair of the Council of the Architectural Association.

She was given an Honorary Fellowship of the Royal Institute of British Architects in 2003 and an Honorary MA from London Metropolitan University in 2006, and was awarded an OBE in the 2012 New Year Honours for services to architecture and education. The annual Thornton Lecture was established in 2017 by Open-City in recognition of her contribution to architecture. Latterly recipient of the Sir Misha Black Award for Innovation in Education in the Built Environment.
