= Open house (school) =

Event where a school is open to families of students

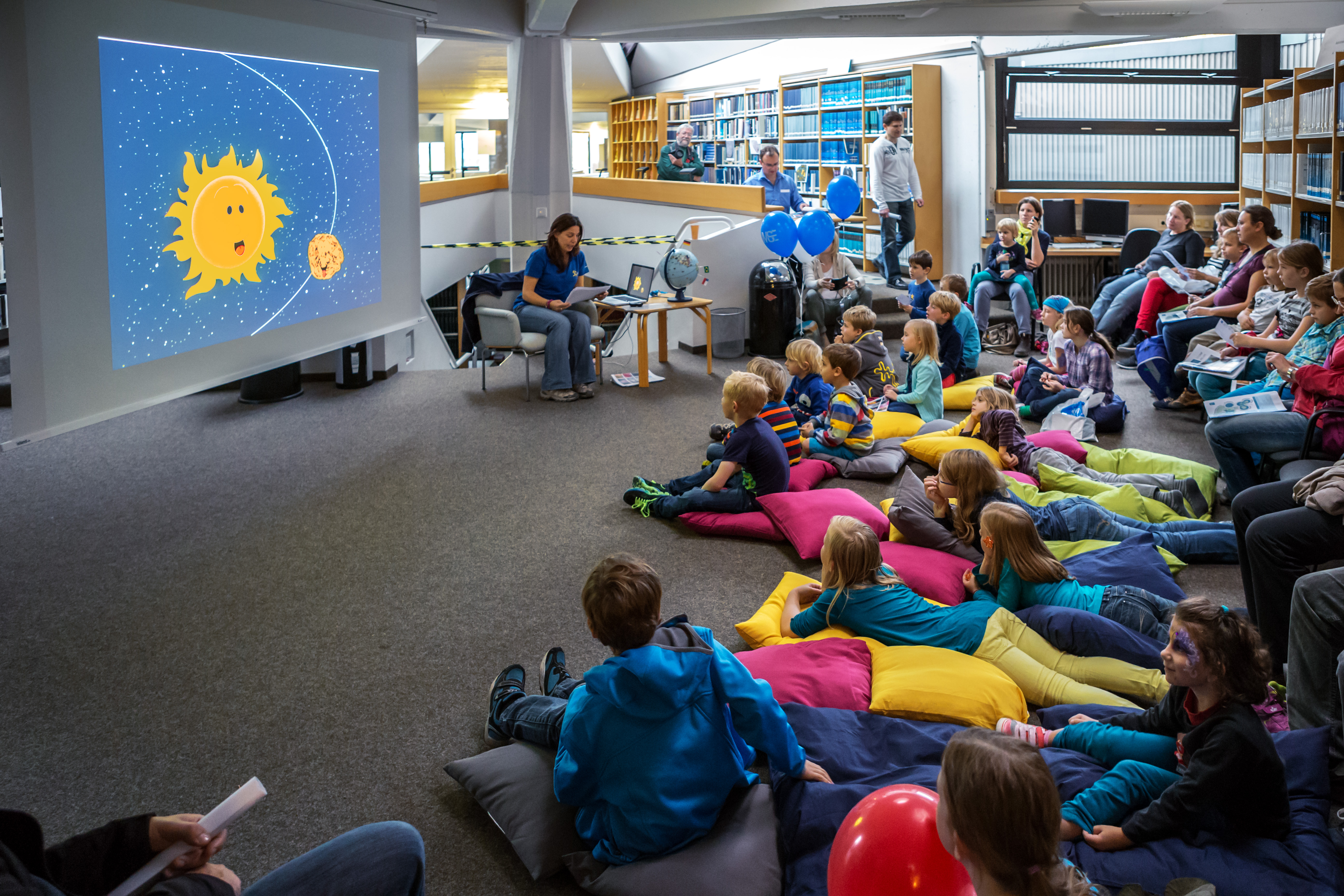
Open House Day 2014 at European Southern Observatory

An open house (also known as open day, at-home day, or parents night) is an event held at an institution where its doors are open to the family of students to allow people to look around the institution and learn about it. These are often held at schools and universities to attract prospective students, familiarize them (and their parents) with the facilities, allow new students to become familiar with facilities and meet others, or to open informal communication channels between school staff and the students and their parents. Open houses are also performed at other types of institutions such as research organizations to present their work to the community-at-large.

== Open houses in American schools ==
School open houses are about two hours long, the length of a good movie or show ... a well-executed event sets the stage for a successful school year. The face-to-face meetings with families help build relationships, increase the visibility of the parent group, and develop a sense of community at school.

Contrary to what its name might seem to imply, an open house at the average school is not intended for general members of the public, but rather, specifically, for the parents and family members of the students who either attend or are considering attending a school. In the overwhelming majority of schools in the United States, open house is held once a year, typically in the first month or first quarter of the school year. It is common for open houses to be held in the evenings or weekends, to allow for parents who work during the standard work-week hours to attend, but holding open house in the daytime is not unusual, especially at elementary schools.

=== Elementary schools ===
In elementary schools, open houses often have no schedule; parents come and go during the scheduled hours as they please, and some teachers may be willing to discuss individual students' progress with their parents. Some schools may schedule displays of school activities, such as a performance by a student choir.

=== Secondary schools ===
In secondary schools—divided into middle schools (also called junior high schools) and high schools (also called senior high schools)—the single most important purpose of the open house is to allow parents and teachers meet each other face-to-face. In many middle schools and high schools, parents are given a schedule, often the same schedule their child follows during the school day. The parents go from one class to another, in the sequence that their child attends them, usually in the very same classrooms. Typically in such open houses the parents have only 5–15 minutes with their child's teacher, which provides time for the teacher to explain their class expectations, but not enough time to look around, actually know classmates, and have a good bond with them.

== See also ==
- Cultural festival (Japan), school open days in Japan
- Conversazione
- Doors Open Days
