= Doors Open Toronto =

Annual event in Ontario, Canada

- Status: Active
- Genre: Doors Open Days
- Date: May
- Frequency: Annually
- Location: Toronto
- Country: Canada
- Years active: 26
- Inaugurated: May 27, 2000
- Organizer: Municipal government of Toronto
- Sponsor: Great Gulf (presenting sponsor)
- Website: www.toronto.ca/explore-enjoy/festivals-events/doors-open-toronto/

Doors Open Toronto is an annual event where approximately 150 buildings of architectural, historic, cultural, and social significance to the city of Toronto open their doors to the public for this free citywide event. Toronto was the first city in North America to launch a Doors Open Day program. Staff at many participating buildings organize guided tours, exhibits, displays, and activities to enrich the visitor experience.

== History ==
Doors Open Toronto was developed as a millennium project in 2000, by the City of Toronto (developed from a European model) and has since attracted over 1.7 million residents and tourists. Doors Open Toronto gives people of all ages and backgrounds the opportunity to learn about Toronto's history, get involved and celebrate Toronto's built heritage.

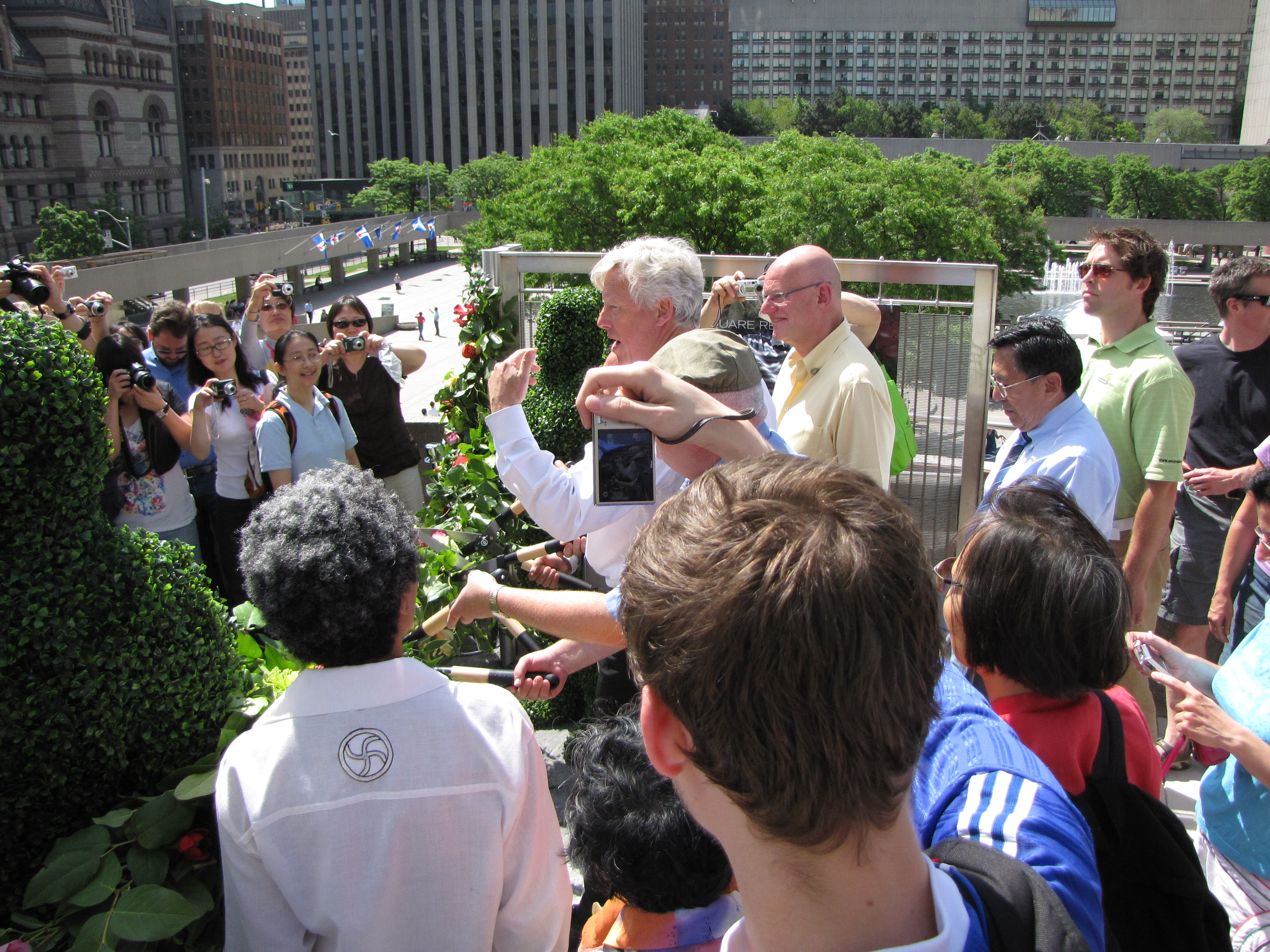
David Miller, the mayor of Toronto, opens Toronto City Hall's green roof to the public during Doors Open in 2010.

The municipal event won several awards in the late 2000s, including the City Soul Award from the Canadian Urban Institute at the Urban Leadership Awards in 2009, as well as the City Manager's Award for Toronto Public Service Excellence and the Canadian Museums Association Awards of Outstanding Achievement in 2010.

Due to the COVID-19 pandemic in Toronto, the 2020 and 2021 editions of the event were cancelled.

== Participants ==
Most buildings are open from 10 a.m. to 5 p.m. on both Saturday and Sunday; however some only open for limited hours. The public is advised to check the "buildings to visit" section of the official website. The list of buildings is made public on May 1 of the calendar year. Some Doors Open Toronto highlighted buildings include: R.C. Harris Water Treatment Plant, Mackenzie House, and TTC carhouses.

=== Sponsors ===
Doors Open Toronto relies heavily on the support of sponsors. The Toronto Star releases the official Doors Open Toronto program guide in May of each year and has been a vital supporter of the program. In 2012, City TV and Omni Television also came on board as Doors Open Toronto media sponsors.

=== Volunteers ===
Doors Open Toronto is managed by the Cultural Services and Special Events Departments at the City of Toronto. Doors Open Toronto relies on the support, as well as enthusiasm of hundreds of volunteers.

Applications are available each fall and can be found on the Doors Open Toronto website.

== Dates and themes ==
The first Doors Open Toronto was held in May 2000. Since then, Doors Open Toronto has been held on the fourth weekend of May. In recent years, each festival has been curated around a theme.

- 2000: May 27, 28
- 2001: May 26, 27
- 2002: May 25, 26
- 2003: May 24, 25
- 2004: May 29, 30
- 2005: May 28, 29
- 2006: May 27, 28
- 2007: May 26, 27 – Sustainability
- 2008: May 24, 25 – Sacred Space
- 2009: May 23, 24 – Toronto's Literature
- 2010: May 29, 30 – Architecture
- 2011: May 28, 29 – Photography
- 2012: May 26, 27 – 200 Years of Building Our City
- 2013: May 25, 26 – Creators, Makers and Innovators
- 2014: May 24, 25 – Secrets and Spirits; Exploring the Mysteries Behind the Door
- 2015: May 23, 24 – Sports, Recreation and Leisure
- 2016: May 28, 29 – Re-used, Re-visited and Revised
- 2017: May 27, 28 – Fifteen Decades of Canadian Architecture
- 2018: May 26, 27 – Film: The Great Romance
- 2019: May 25, 26 – 20 Something
- 2020: The event was originally scheduled for May 23 and 24; however, due to the evolving situation surrounding the COVID-19 pandemic, and with major events and festivals being banned by the City of Toronto until at least June 30, 2020, the event was cancelled.
- 2021: The event was originally scheduled for May 29 and 30; it was cancelled due to the ongoing COVID-19 pandemic.
- 2022: May 28, 29 – Renewal
- 2023: May 27, 28 – City of Sound
- 2024: May 25, 26 – Hidden Histories
- 2025: May 24, 25 – The City is Your Playground; Get Ready to Play
- 2026: May 23, 24 – The World in a City

== See also ==
- Doors Open Canada
- List of oldest buildings and structures in Toronto
- Open House Chicago
- Open House New York
