= Open House New York =

American nonprofit organization

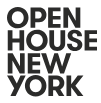
- Abbreviation: OHNY
- Founded: March 12, 2002; 24 years ago
- Founder: Scott Lauer
- Tax ID no.: 02-0540261
- Legal status: 501(c)(3) nonprofit organization
- Headquarters: 1133 Broadway, Suite 802, New York, New York 10010, US
- Employees: 6
- Website: www.ohny.org

Open House New York (OHNY) is a cultural nonprofit organization that holds annual Doors Open Days. It was founded in 2001 in New York City.

== Organization ==
Open House New York (OHNY) is a 501(c)(3) nonprofit organization that hosts educational programs to promote awareness and appreciation of New York's architecture, design and cultural heritage. In addition to behind the scenes looks at iconic buildings, the Festival also provides access to organizations that are not regularly open to the public.

== History ==
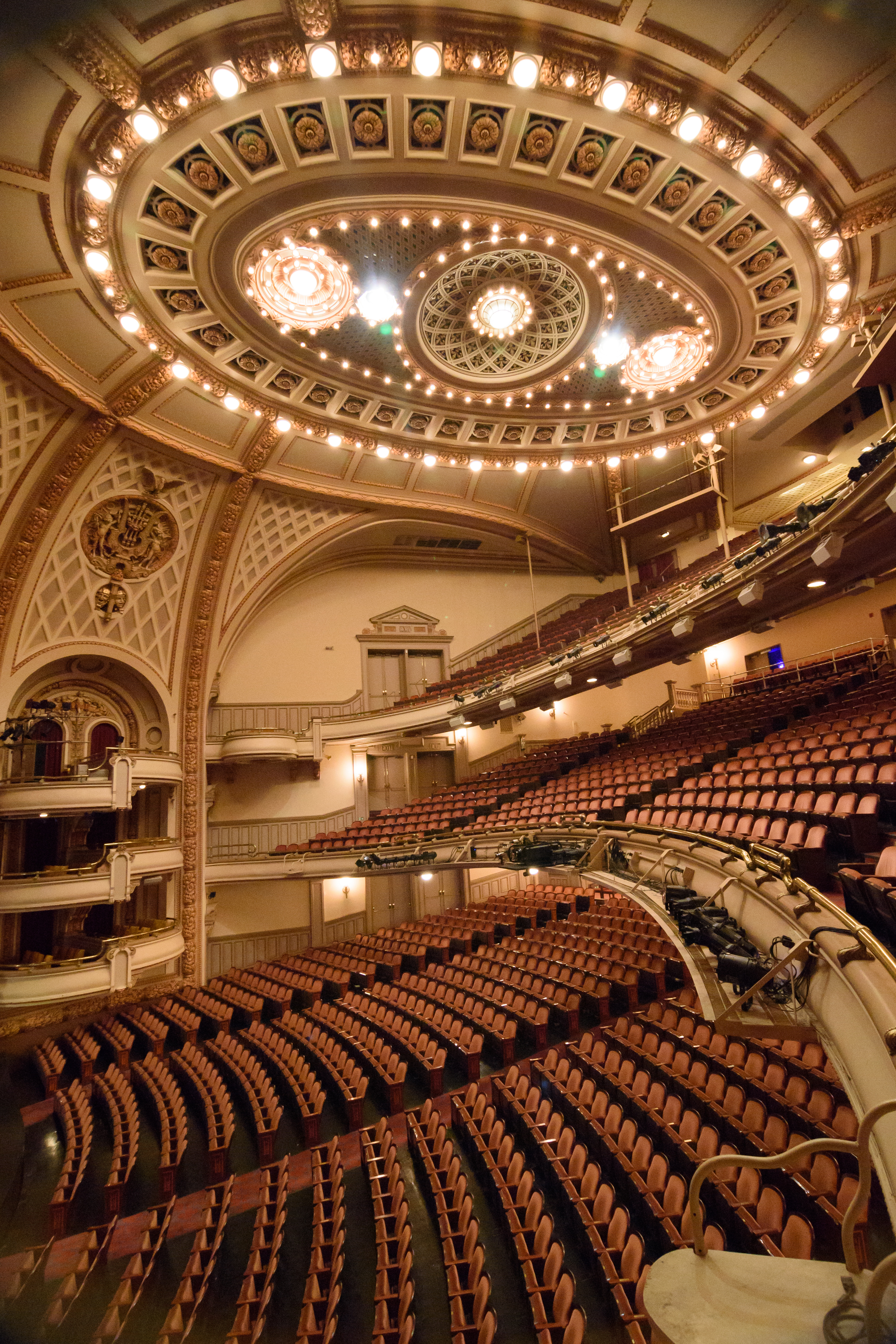
OHNY gives visitors the opportunity to explore many sites, including the Howard Gilman Opera House, shown here photographed during OHNY 2016.

The first-ever OHNY Weekend took place on October 11 and 12, 2003. By the 7th festival in 2009, it had grown to 185,000 visitors to more than 190 sites. OHNY offered 130 free of charge tours, workshops and onsite talks. 125 art, civic, educational and cultural organizations and 70 architecture and design firms participated. The 13th edition and 14th editions, in 2015 and 2016, respectively, included a photo contest in partnership with Wikipedia. Three prizes were awarded.

In the spirit of accessibility, in 2022 Open House New York introduced lottery-based access that eliminated the reservation fee to access many participating sites.

== See also ==
- Archtober
- Open House London
- Open House Chicago
- Doors Open Days
  - Doors Open Canada
  - Doors Open Toronto
