= Open House (band) =

Open House was an Irish folk band led by Kevin Burke from 1992 to 1999.

== Band members led by Kevin Burke on fiddle ==
- Mark Graham - harmonica, clarinet, vocals
- Paul Kotapish - guitar, mandolin, cittern
- Sandy Silva - foot percussion

== Discography ==
- Open House (1992)
- Second Story (1994)
- Hoof and Mouth (1997)
