= Doors Open Days =

Access to buildings not publicly accessible

Doors Open Days (also known as Open House or Open Days in some communities) provide free access to buildings not normally open to the public. The first Doors Open Day took place in France in 1984, and the concept has spread to other places in Europe (see European Heritage Days), North America, Australia and elsewhere.

Doors Open Days promotes architecture and heritage sites to a wider audience within and beyond the country's borders. It is an opportunity to discover hidden architectural gems and to see behind doors that are rarely open to the public for free.

Open Doors Days trace their origin to the 1990 Door Open Day held as part of Glasgow's year as European City of Culture.

== Heritage Open Days in England ==
Heritage Open Days established in 1994 celebrate English architecture and culture allowing visitors free access to historical landmarks that are either not usually open to the public, or would normally charge an entrance fee.

=== List of Doors Open events in England ===
- Open House London

== Scotland ==
Doors Open Days is organised by the Scottish Civic Trust. Alongside Scottish Archaeology Month, the open days form Scotland's contribution to European Heritage Days. This joint initiative between the Council of Europe and the European Union aims to give people a greater understanding of each other through sharing and exploring cultural heritage. 49 countries across Europe take part annually, in September.

During Glasgow's year as European City of Culture in 1990, organisers ran an Open Doors event, an event credited with popularizing the Doors Open concept and spreading it to other countries. Its popularity encouraged other areas to take part the following year and were coordinated by the Scottish Civic Trust. Doors Open Days now take place throughout Scotland thanks to a team of area coordinators. These coordinators work for a mixture of organisations: local councils, civic trusts, heritage organisations and archaeological trusts.

Scotland is one of the few participating countries where events take place every weekend in September, with different areas choosing their own dates. More than 900 buildings now take part. In 2008, over 225,000 visits were made generating £2 million for the Scottish economy. It is estimated that 5,000 or more volunteers give their time to run activities and open doors for members of the public.

Doors Open Days was supported in 2009 by Homecoming Scotland 2009, a year-long initiative that marked the 250th anniversary of the birth of Scotland's national poet, Robert Burns. It was funded by the Scottish Government and part financed by the European Union through the European Regional Development Fund. Its aim was to engage Scots at home, as well as motivate people of Scottish descent and those who simply love Scotland, to take part in an inspirational celebration of Scottish culture and heritage.

== Open Doors events in Wales ==
Funded and organised by the Wales conservation organisation, Cadw, an Open Doors festival takes place every September, giving free access to many Cadw and non-Cadw sites. It was claimed to be "the largest annual free celebration of architecture and heritage" in the UK. In 2021 more than 150 historic sites took part in the event.

== Open house in Australia ==
Open House events are organised in Australia in partnership with Open House Worldwide. The first Open House event took place in Melbourne in 2008 (the Melbourne Open House event has since changed into an event primarily focused on modern architecture). This was followed by Brisbane in 2010, and Adelaide and Perth in 2012.

== Canada ==
Doors Open Canada began in 2000.

=== List of Doors Open events in Canada ===
- Doors Open Newfoundland and Labrador
- Doors Open Ottawa
- Doors Open Toronto
- Doors Open Saskatoon
- Doors Open London
- Doors Open Peterborough

== United States ==
=== List of Doors Open events in the U.S. ===
- Doors Open Baltimore, first weekend in October
- Doors Open Buffalo
- Open House Chicago
- Doors Open Lowell
- Open House New York
- Doors Open Milwaukee
- Doors Open Minneapolis
- Doors Open Pittsburgh, first weekend in October
- Doors Open Rhode Island
- Passport DC, embassy open houses in Washington, D.C., in May.

== See also ==
- Brisbane Open House
- Open House Brno
- Tourism in Scotland
- Culture night
- Open house (school)
