= Doors Open Canada =

National program by Heritage Canada

Doors Open Canada is a national program by Heritage Canada, based on the Doors Open Days concept. It aims to share architecture and heritage culture by inviting the public to explore them for free since 2000, with the launch of the first Doors Open event in Ontario. Since 2003, Doors Open Newfoundland and Labrador has added new communities each year.

== Events ==
Doors Open events have been held in the following cities (first year indicated):

- Doors Open Toronto, Ontario – 2000
- Doors Open London, Ontario – 2002
- Doors Open Ottawa, Ontario – 2002
- Doors Open Calgary, Alberta – 2003
- Doors Open St. John's, Newfoundland and Labrador – 2003
- Doors Open Waterloo Region, Ontario – 2003
- Doors Open Cornwall and Seaway Valley, Ontario – 2003
- Doors Open Brandon, Manitoba – 2004
- Doors Open Newtown, Newfoundland and Labrador – 2004
- Doors Open Placentia – 2004
- Doors Open Richmond, British Columbia – 2004
- Doors Open Brigus and Cupids, Newfoundland and Labrador – 2005
- Doors Open Whitehorse, Yukon – 2005
- Doors Open Paris, Ontario – 2005
- Doors Open Placentia, Newfoundland and Labrador – 2005
- Doors Open Saskatoon, Saskatchewan – 2005
- Doors Open Conception Bay South, Newfoundland and Labrador – 2006
- Doors Open Winnipeg, Manitoba – 2006
- Doors Open Trinity Bight, Newfoundland and Labrador – 2006
- Doors Open Corner Brook, Newfoundland and Labrador – 2006
- Doors Open Brampton, Ontario – 2007
- Doors Open Victoria, British Columbia – 2008
- Doors Open Grimsby, Ontario – 2011
- Doors Open Haldimand, Ontario – September 17, 2011
- Doors Open Halifax – 2013, 2014, 2015, 2016, 2017
