= Treasure Houses of England =

Heritage consortium

The Treasure Houses of England group is a heritage consortium. It was founded in the early 1970s by nine of the foremost stately homes in England still in private ownership, with the aim of marketing and promoting themselves as tourist venues.

== Houses ==
Eleven houses are currently in the group. These are (together with their location and historic owners):

- Beaulieu Palace House in Hampshire (Barons Montagu of Beaulieu)
- Blenheim Palace in Oxfordshire (Dukes of Marlborough)
- Burghley House in Cambridgeshire (Marquesses of Exeter) – now overseen by Burghley House Preservation Trust Limited.
- Castle Howard in North Yorkshire (Earls of Carlisle) – now overseen by a Howard family company, Castle Howard Estate Limited.
- Chatsworth House in Derbyshire (Dukes of Devonshire)
- Harewood House in West Yorkshire (Earls of Harewood)
- Hatfield House in Hertfordshire (Marquesses of Salisbury)
- Holkham Hall in Norfolk (Earls of Leicester)
- Leeds Castle in Kent (various families, ending with Olive, Lady Baillie) – now owned by Leeds Castle Foundation.
- Raby Castle in County Durham (Barons Barnard)
- Woburn Abbey in Bedfordshire (Dukes of Bedford)

== Gallery ==
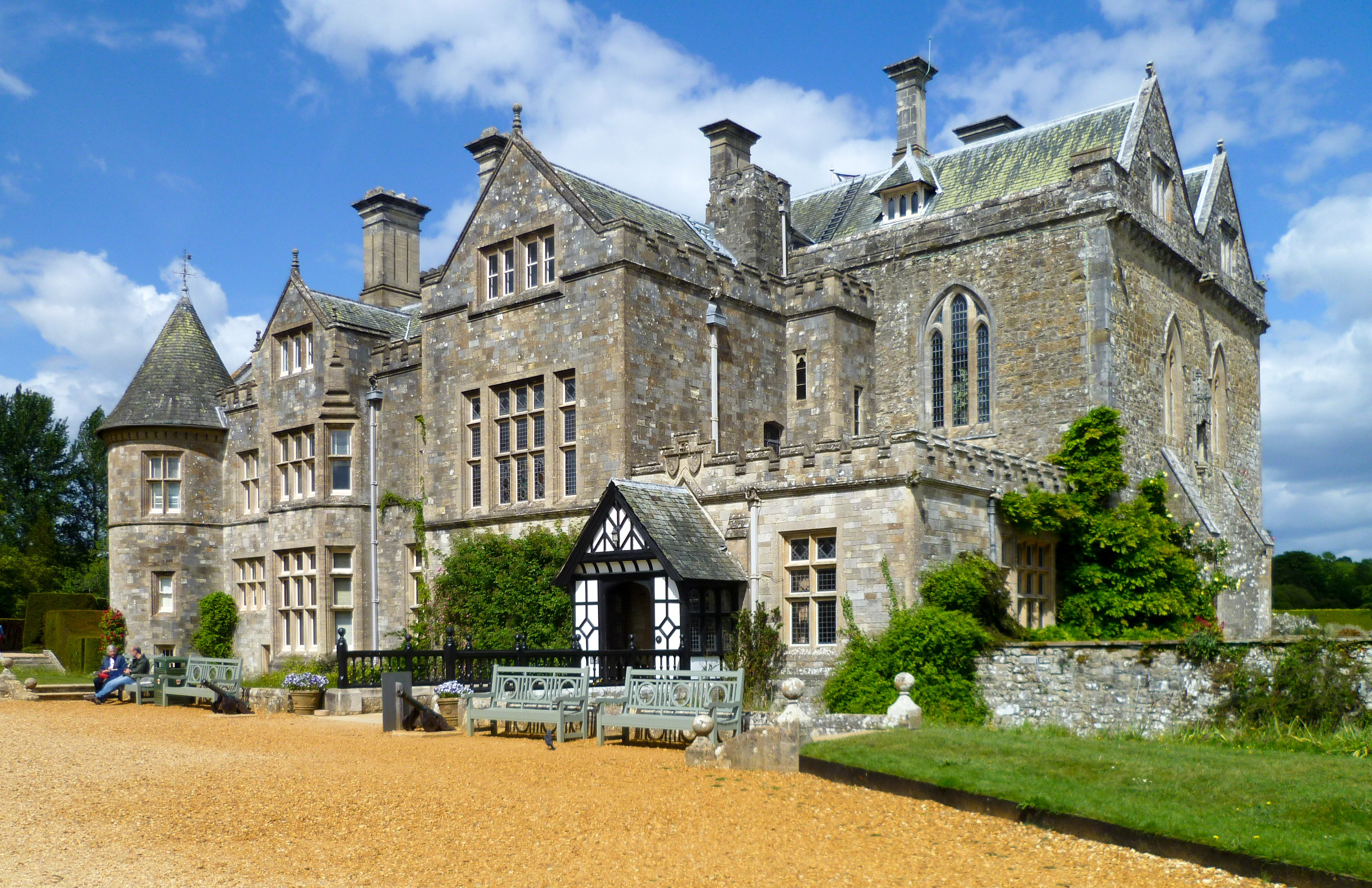
Beaulieu Palace House

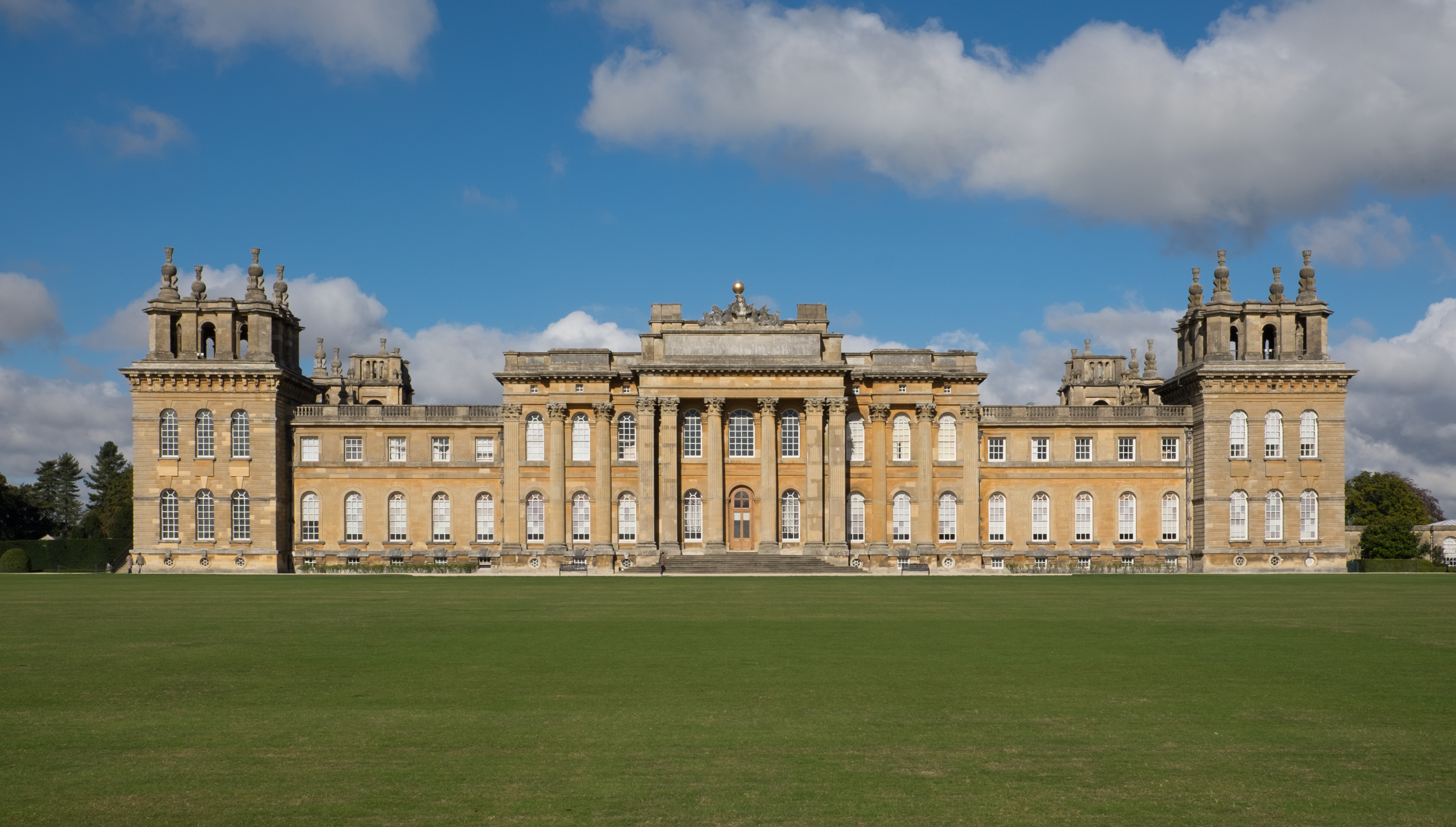
Blenheim Palace

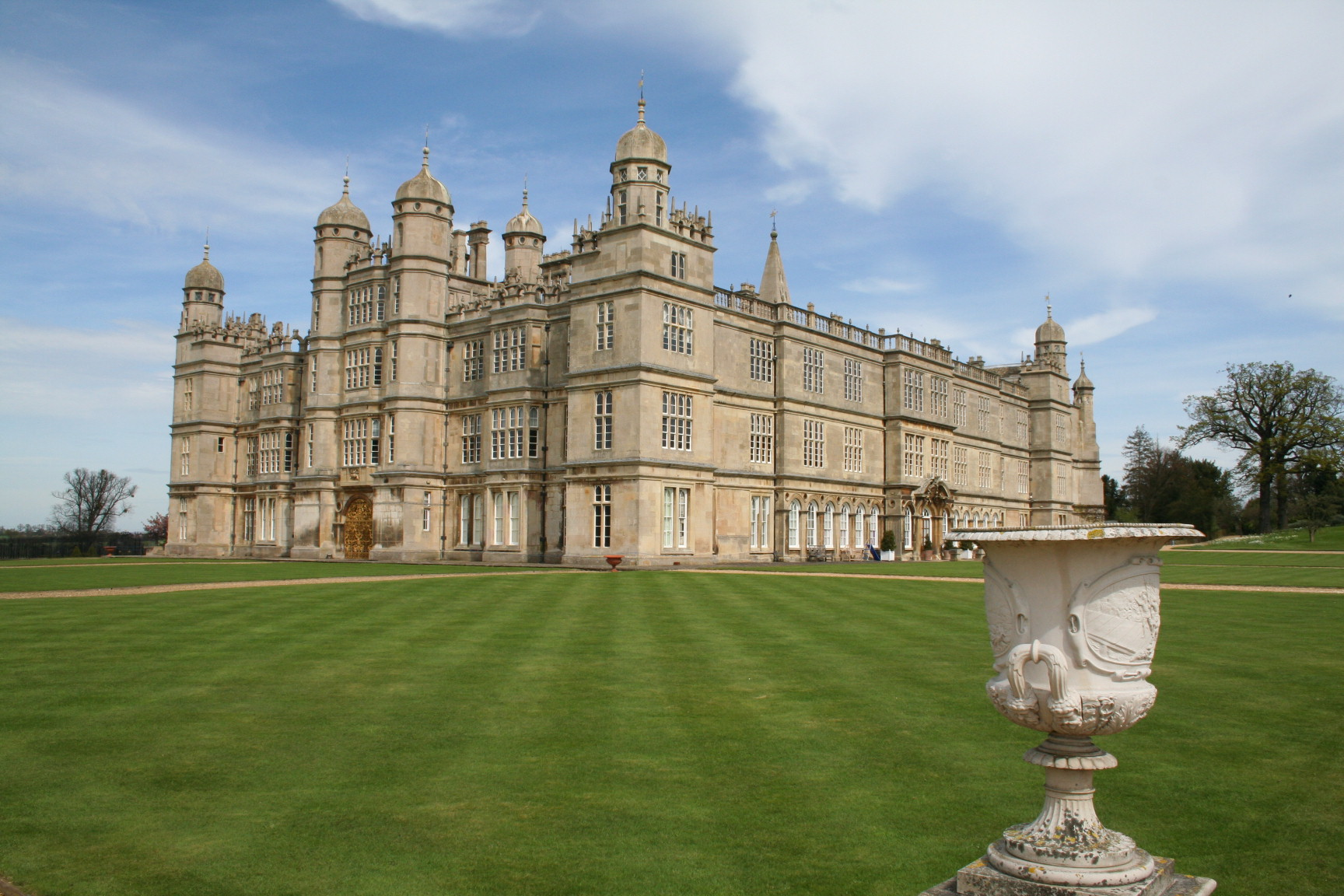
Burghley House

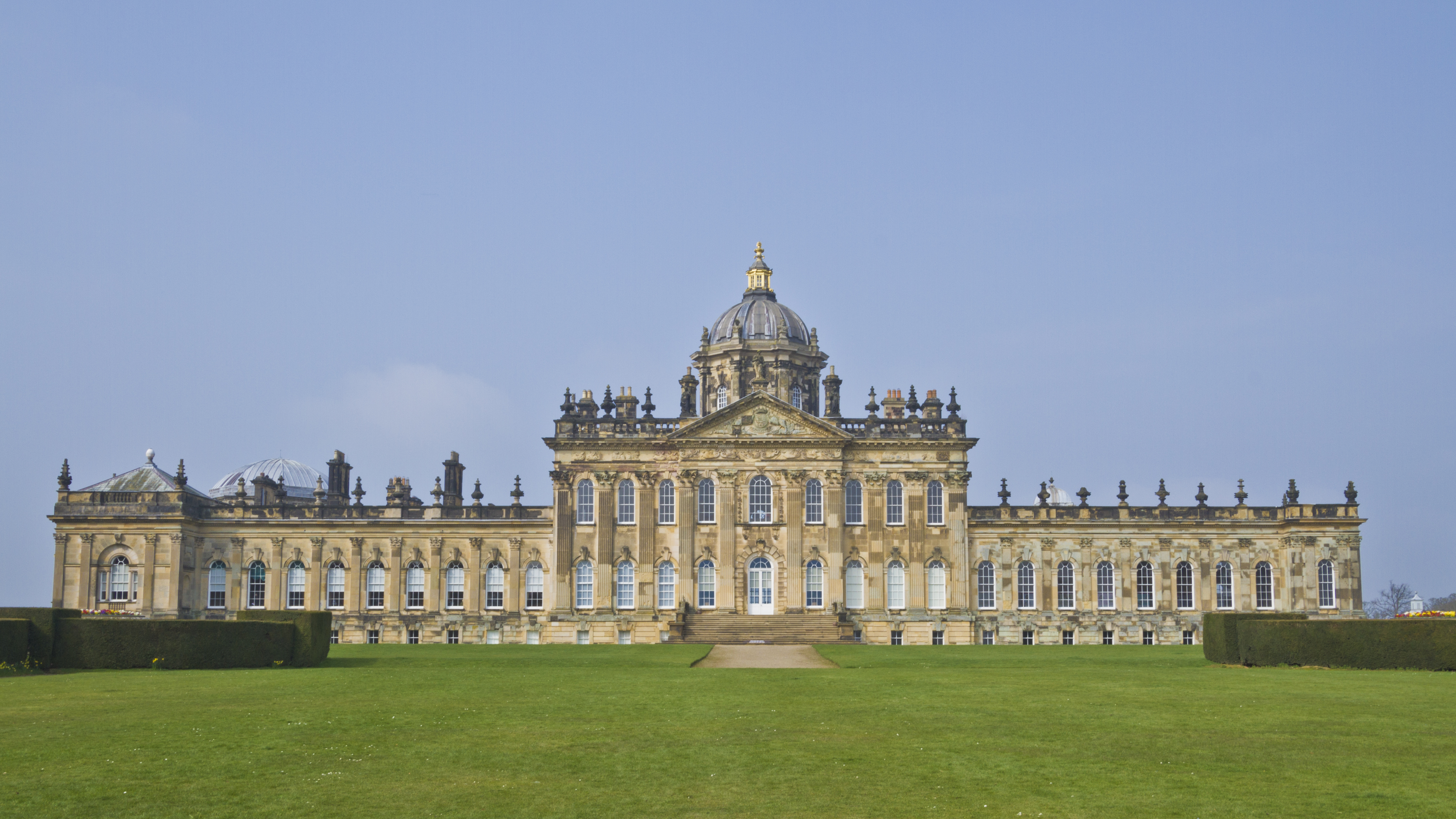
Castle Howard

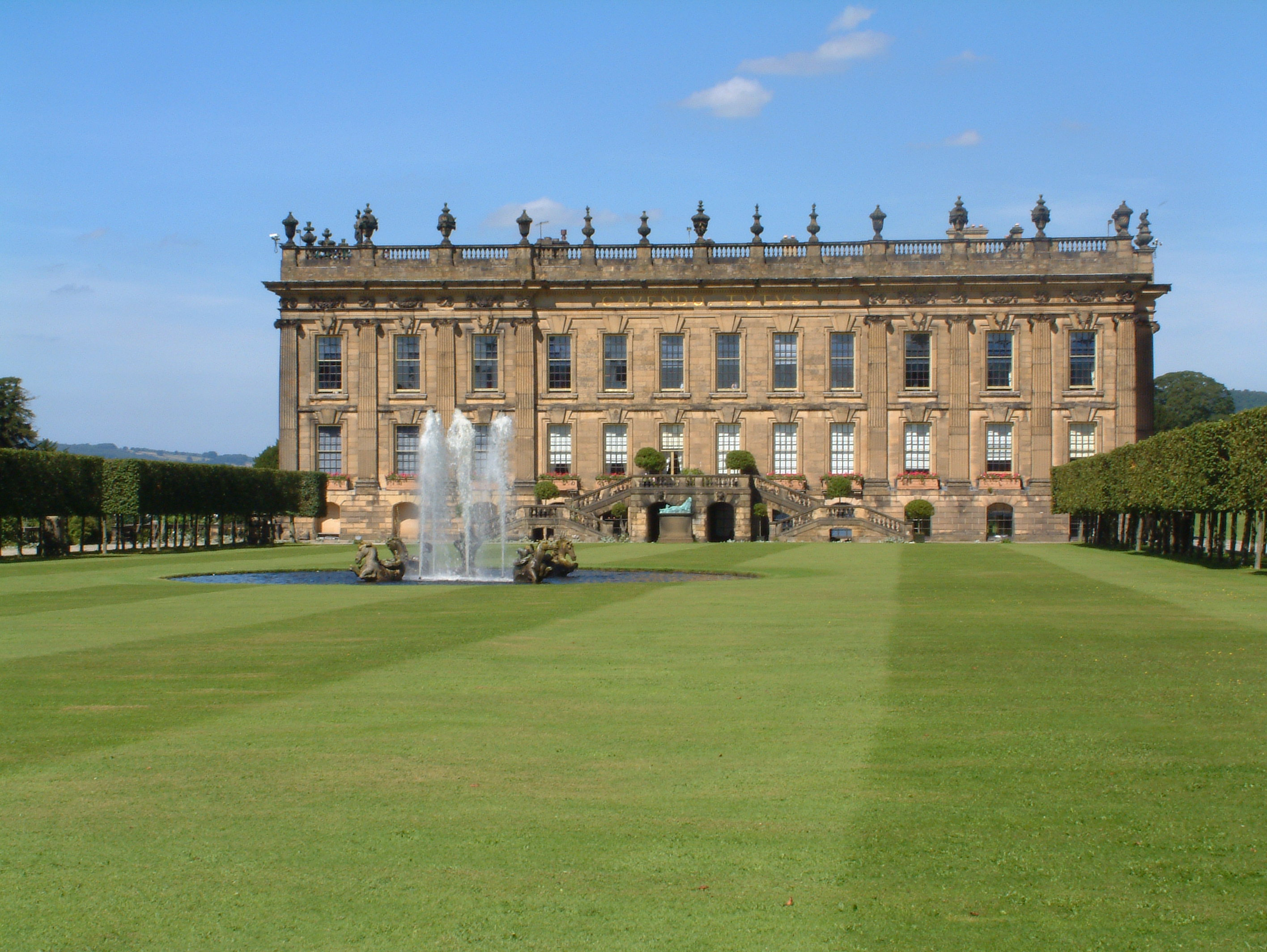
Chatsworth House

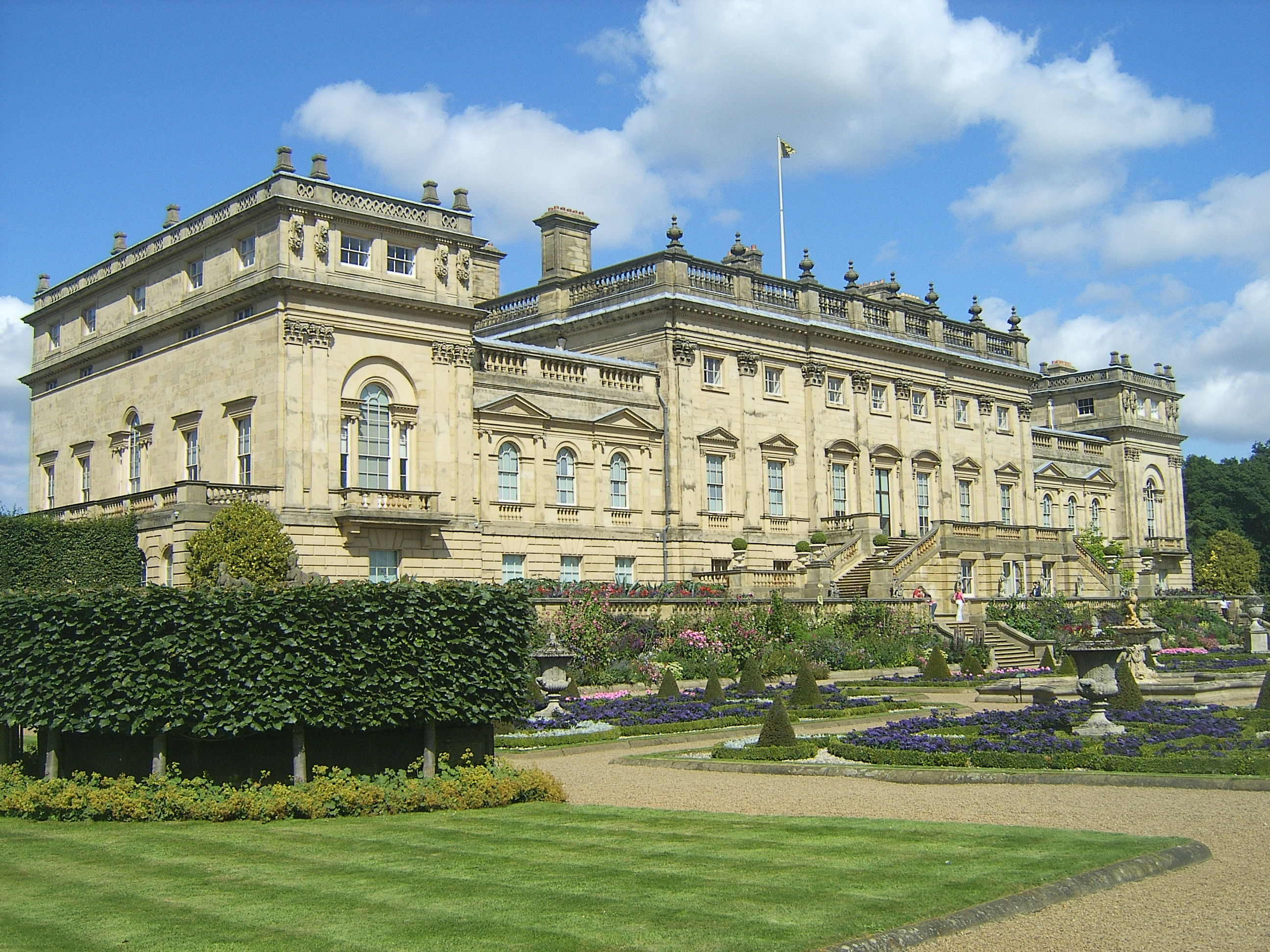
Harewood House

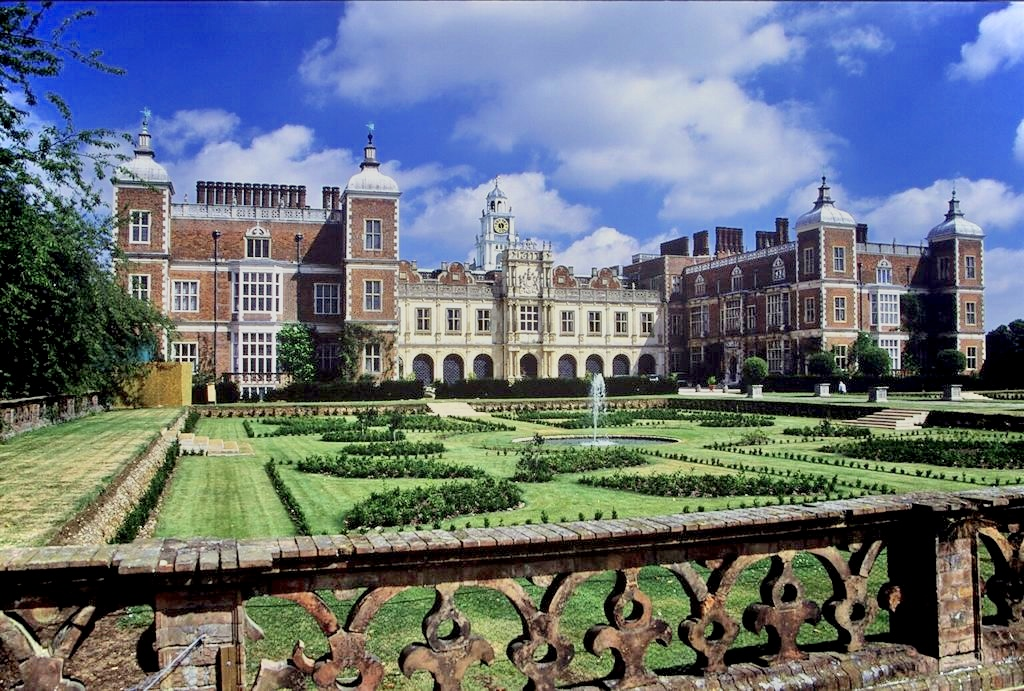
Hatfield House

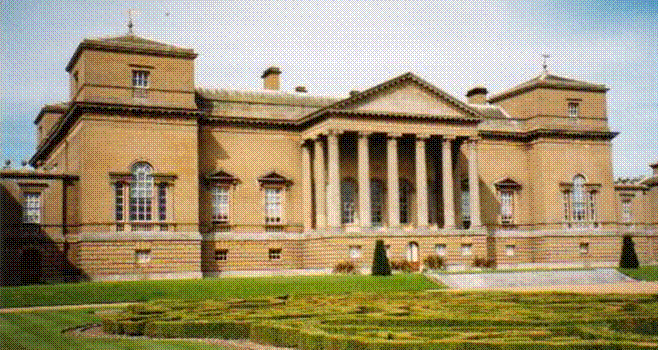
Holkham Hall

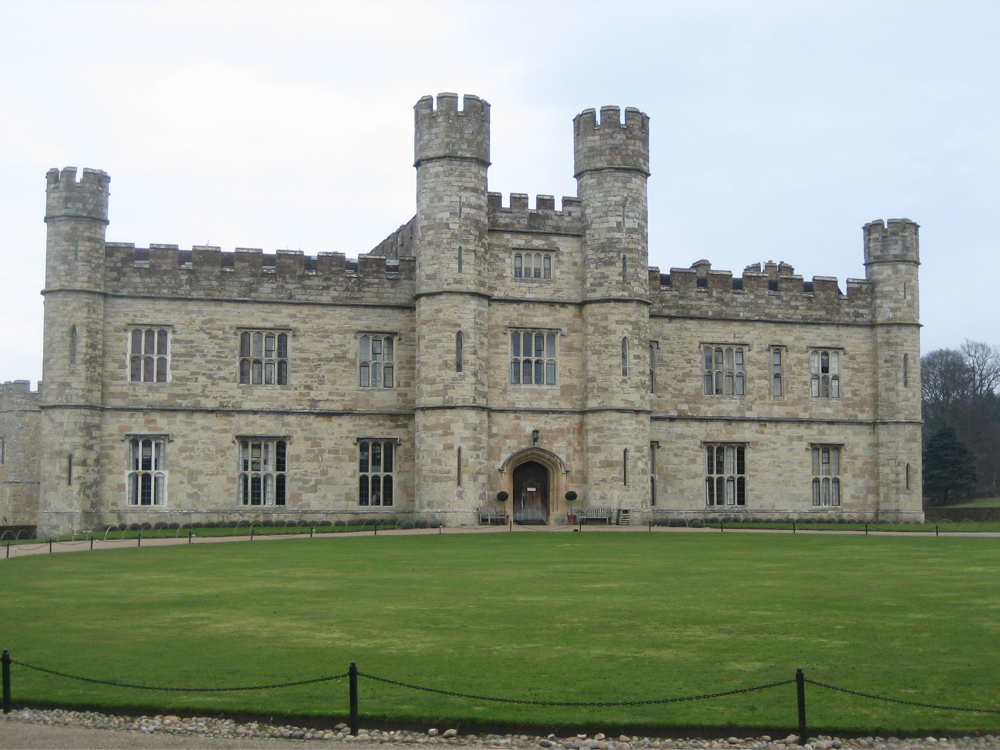
Leeds Castle

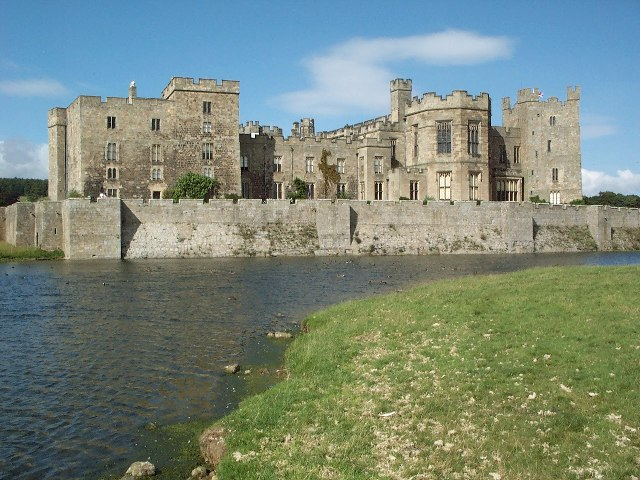
Raby Castle

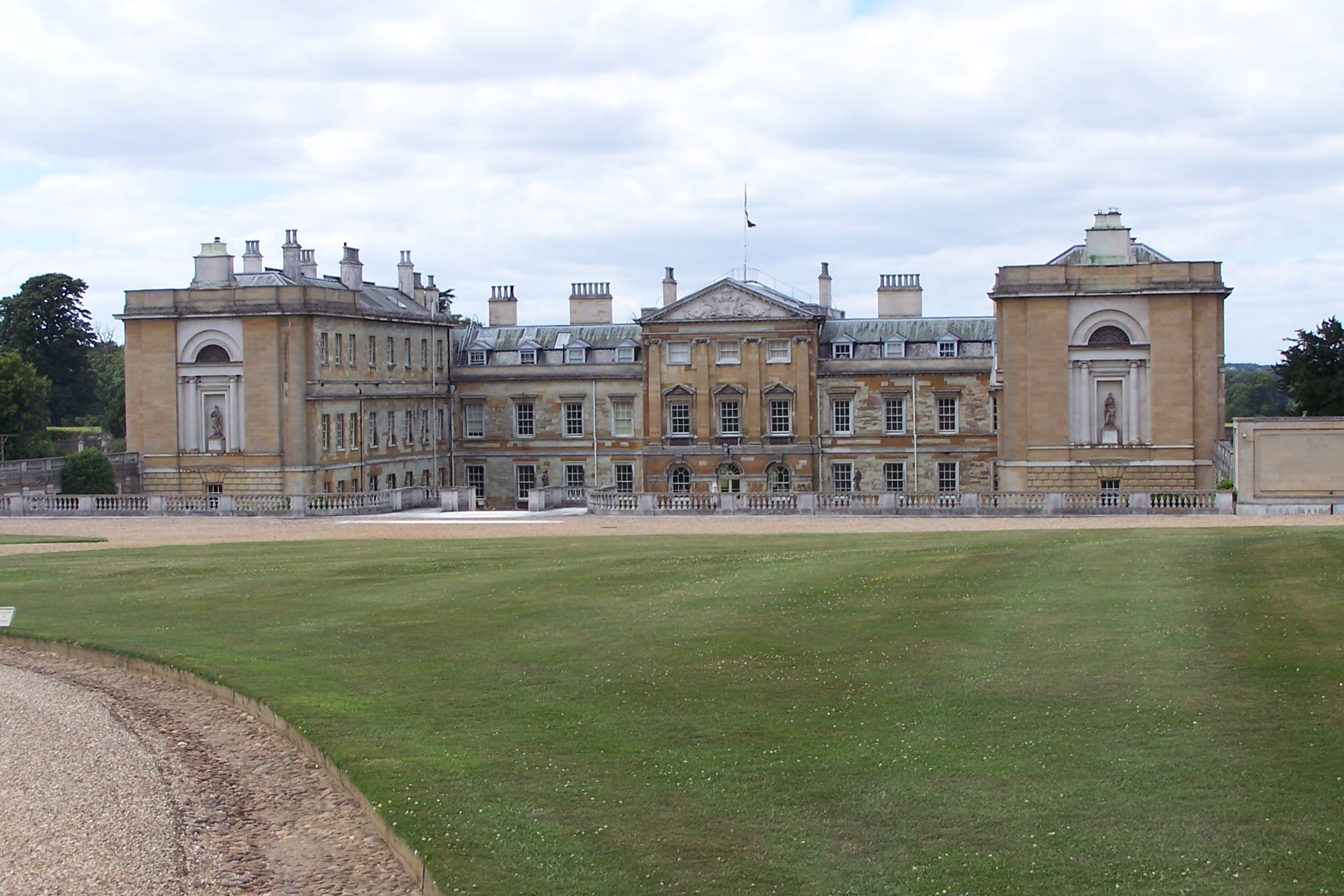
Woburn Abbey

== See also ==
- Historic Houses Association
