= Historic Houses Association =

UK non-profit organisation

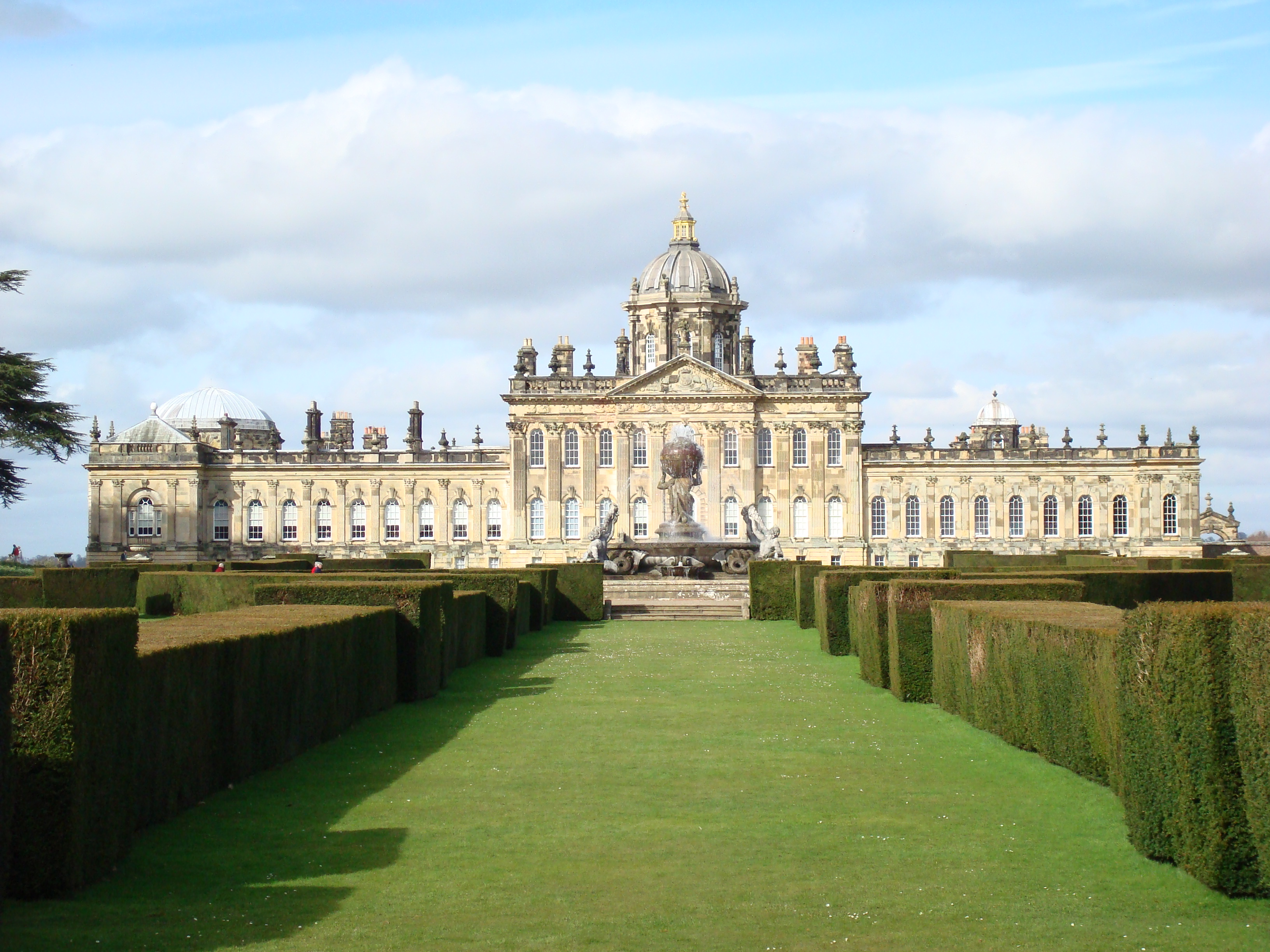
South (garden) facade of Castle Howard

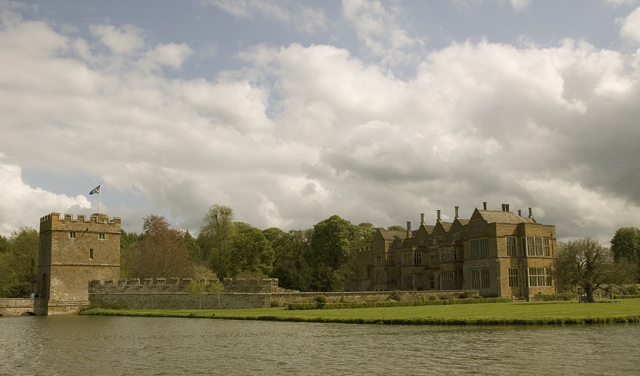
Broughton Castle across the moat

Historic Houses (formerly, and still for legal purposes, known as the Historic Houses Association or HHA) is a not-for-profit organisation that represents well over a thousand independently owned historic country houses, castles and gardens throughout the United Kingdom.

== History ==
The association originated as the Historic Houses Committee of the British Tourist Authority, and was independently established in 1973 to help owners maintain and conserve significant homes in the interests of the nation's heritage.

In 1974, the HHA participated in a campaign in response to the publication of a governmental green paper on a proposed wealth tax. The campaign, which also involved the National Trust and the predecessor of The Arts Society, drew public attention to the problems such a tax could cause for historic buildings and national art collections. The tax was not implemented, and the HHA subsequently continued to lobby for tax exemptions for heritage sites and to promote private ownership of historic houses. Today, Historic Houses represents, advises, and helps to publicise its member properties, and runs an access scheme for the general public.

While a large majority of member places are privately owned (and most of those are still lived in), houses, castles, and gardens cared for by independent charitable trusts, local authorities, institutions, or businesses are also eligible for membership, and there are several hundred such member places represented. Typically a dwelling must be listed at Grade I or Grade II* (in England & Wales; or the equivalent level in Scotland or Northern Ireland), but a substantial minority of member places are large Grade II houses.

More than half of member properties (c. 800) open their doors in some way, from visitors on a day or, special tour, or school trip, through to film locations, weddings and events, or as memorable places to stay. Historic Houses member attractions between them receive more than 28 million visitors each year.

Historic Houses offers a 'visitor membership' to the public; several hundred participating house and garden attractions offer card-holders free entry. Several hundred more houses that do not normally open offer occasional accompanied tours, which can be booked through the association's 'Invitation to View' platform. The association publishes Historic House magazine quarterly.

Historic Houses runs five awards for its member places: The Garden of the Year, The Restoration Award, The Frances Garnham Education Award, The Sustainability Award, and The Collections Award.

== Some well-known member houses of Historic Houses ==
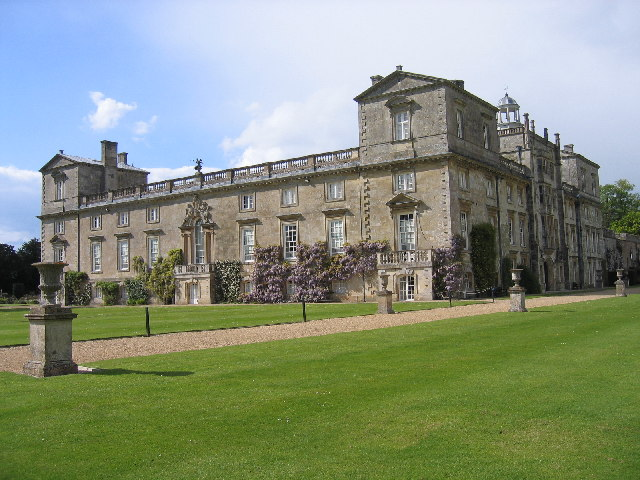
The south front of Wilton House

Hundreds of member houses and gardens offer free entry to visitor members of the association, including:

- Alnwick Castle
- Althorp House
- Athelhampton House
- Auckland Castle
- Berkeley Castle
- Blair Castle
- Blenheim Palace
- Boughton House
- Broughton Castle
- Burghley House
- Doddington Hall, Cheshire
- Drumlanrig Castle
- Grimsthorpe Castle
- Haddon Hall
- Hever Castle
- Holker Hall
- Holkham Hall
- Kiplin Hall
- Knebworth House
- Powderham Castle
- Syon House
- Wilton House
- Woburn Abbey

== See also ==
- Treasure Houses of England
