= Open House Chicago =

Annual festival in Chicago

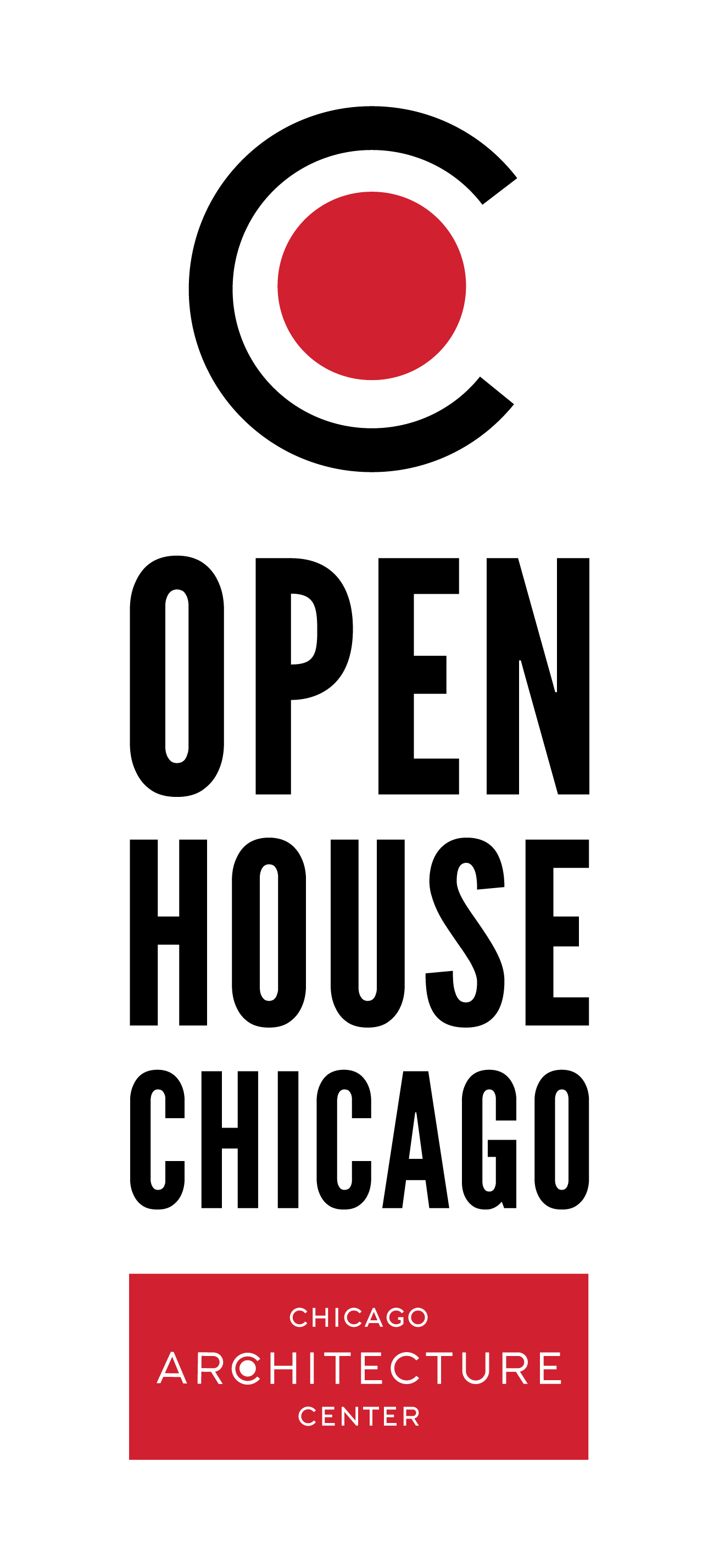
Open House Chicago logo

Open House Chicago (OHC) is a free weekend festival held annually in Chicago that allows participants to visit dozens of buildings that are not typically open to the public.

OHC is organized by the Chicago Architecture Foundation over a two-day period each year in mid-October. The event promotes appreciation of architecture by the general public.

OHC began in 2011 and it is part of a worldwide network of Open House events that started with Open House London in 1992. Its organizers state that event objectives include enabling participants to “venture into new neighborhoods, learn the stories of Chicago’s architecture and experience the diversity and culture of each community.” OHC is an important event for tourism in Chicago. Funding for the event comes from the Chicago Architecture Center and from corporate sponsors, government agencies, foundations, and individual donors. The event relies on approximately 2,600 volunteers to staff participating buildings.

== Dates and attendance ==
Dates	Number of sites	Visits to included sites	Estimated individual attendees	source
Oct 15–16, 2011	131	84,000	23,000	
Oct 13–14, 2012	198	142,000	40,000	
Oct 19–20, 2013	157	194,000	55,000	
Oct 18–19, 2014	167	285,000	75,000	
Oct 17–18, 2015	204	320,000	85,000	
Oct 15–16, 2016	213	380,000	100,000	
Oct 14–15, 2017	257	347,000	91,000	
Oct 13–14, 2018	280	366,000	100,000	
Oct 19–20, 2019	almost 350			
Oct 16–Nov 1, 2020	over 500	0	0	Virtual due to COVID-19 pandemic
Oct 16–17, 2021	over 100			
Oct 15–16, 2022	over 150			
Oct 14–15, 2023	over 170			
Oct 19–20, 2024	over 170			

== Sites ==
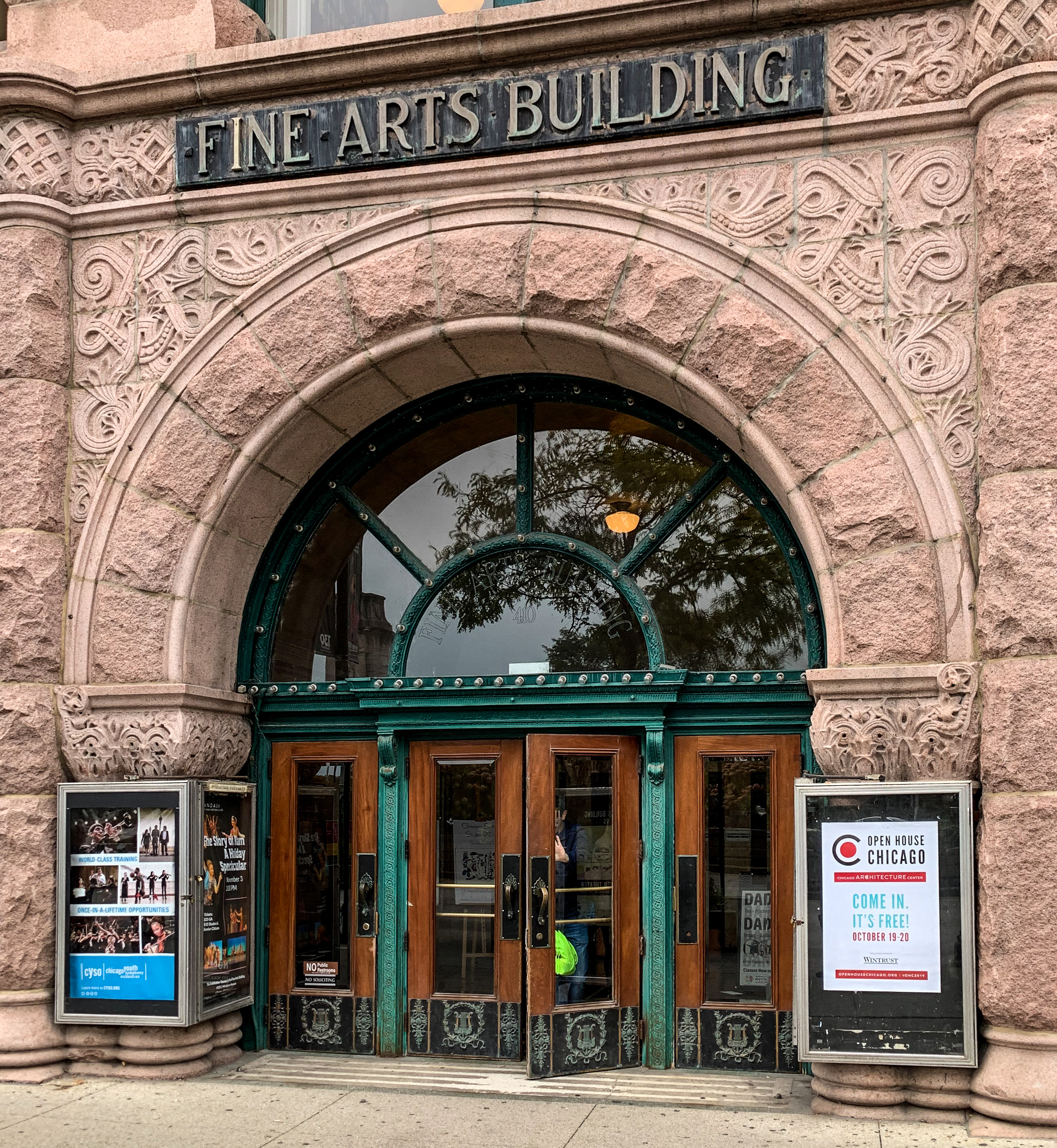
A sign announces the participation of the Fine Arts Building in 2019's Open House

Sites include spaces inside historic and architecturally significant buildings that aren't generally open to the public, including historic mansions, Frank Lloyd Wright homes, theaters, skyscrapers, exclusive private clubs, opulent hotel ballrooms and suites, rooftops, industrial sites and design and architecture offices.

Highlights include Tribune Tower, Kemper Building, Federal Reserve Bank of Chicago, Fine Arts Building, Chicago Board of Trade Building, The Rookery, Aon Center, Chicago Temple Building, Emil Bach House, Elks National Memorial, New Regal Theater and more. The Studebaker Theater was a site in 2013 and 2014 prior to its reopening in 2015, and the long-shuttered Uptown Theatre was a site in 2026.

== See also ==
- Chicago Architecture Foundation
- Open House New York
- Open House London
- Doors Open Toronto
- Open House Brno
