= Old Bishopsbourne =

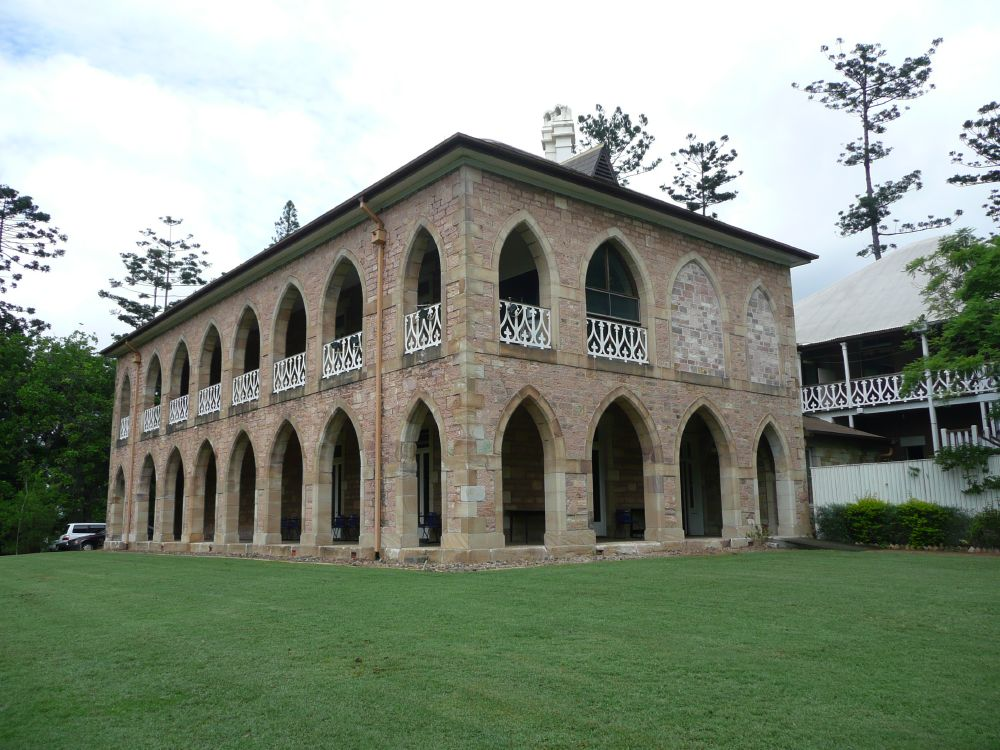
- Old Bishopsbourne, 2009

- Location within Queensland Location within Australia
- 27.4675°S 153.0033°E
- Location: 233 Milton Road, Milton, City of Brisbane, Queensland, Australia

History
- Design period: 1840s–1860s (mid-19th century)
- Built: 1865–1959

Site notes
- Architect: Benjamin Backhouse

Queensland Heritage Register
- Official name: Old Bishopsbourne, St Francis Theological College, Bishopsbourne
- Type: state heritage (built, landscape)
- Designated: 21 October 1992
- Reference no.: 600254
- Significant period: 1860s–1880s, 1910s, 1930s, 1950s (fabric); 1860s–1960s (hisdtorical)
- Significant components: college – ecclesiastical/theological, driveway, cellar, residential accommodation – bishop's house, cloister/s, library – building, views to, gate – entrance, terracing, chapel, service wing, garden/grounds

Old Bishopsbourne is a heritage-listed house at 233 Milton Road, Milton, City of Brisbane, Queensland, Australia. It was designed by Benjamin Backhouse and built from 1865 to 1959. It is also known as St Francis Theological College and Bishopsbourne. It was added to the Queensland Heritage Register on 21 October 1992.

== History ==
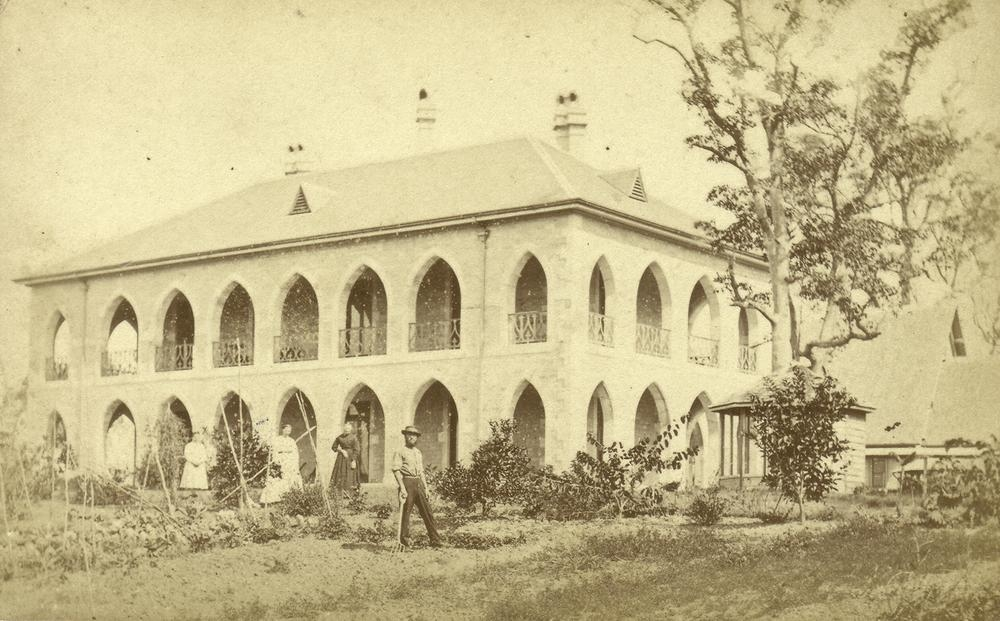
Old Bishopsbourne

This two-storeyed stone residence was constructed in 1865–68 for Edward Tufnell, the first Anglican Bishop of Brisbane (1860–74), as his See house. It remained the home of the Anglican primates of Brisbane until 1964.

In 1862 Tufnell, on behalf of the Anglican Church, received from Emmeline Leslie a gift of 16 acres (6.5 ha) of eucalypt woodland along the Milton Road. The site was earmarked for a See house.

During a short sojourn in England, Tufnell raised £4,400 for the Brisbane Diocese. Despite popular opposition to the expense, £3,000 of this was spent constructing Bishopsbourne.

The architect was Benjamin Backhouse, who had practised in Geelong, Ballarat and London, before arriving in Brisbane in 1861. Backhouse left Brisbane for Sydney in 1868, but in the short time he was resident in Queensland, his work was prolific, ranging from houses to churches to school to hotels to commercial and warehouse premises. Among these works were a number of substantial Brisbane residences – such as:

- Cintra House at Bowen Hills in 1863–64
- Fernberg at Bardon c. 1865
- Baroona at Rosalie in 1866

and several ecclesiastic buildings, including:

- the first All Saints Anglican Church on Wickham Terrace, erected in 1861–62
- St Stephen's School and convent in 1862
- St Mary's Convent at Ipswich in 1863–63
- the second St Stephen's Cathedral, commenced in 1863–64
- the first St Mary's Catholic Church at Warwick, erected 1863–65

In the mid-1860s he designed National Schools at Toowoomba, Warwick, Condamine, Laidley, Goondiwindi, Nanango, Bald Hills, Bowen, Maryborough and Fortitude Valley for the Queensland Board of Education. He also designed the first Brisbane Grammar School in Roma Street, constructed 1868–69.

During construction of the residence, much of the indigenous woodland was cleared. Remnants survive, but most of the eucalypts are secondary growth. Garden beds for flowers, vegetables and fruit were established in the 1870s. Hoop and bunya pines, staghorns and elkhorns were introduced at this period as well. Pencil pines were planted after 1912.

In the 1870s, porphyry and sandstone gateposts were erected on Milton Road, defining the entrance to the carriage approach to the See house. A timber chapel designed by diocesan architect Richard George Suter was constructed in the grounds c. 1870, but was replaced in 1912 by the current stone building (Old Bishopsbourne Chapel).

In 1886 Brisbane architects Banks and Carandini designed a two-storeyed brick and stone kitchen/service wing to replace an earlier wooden structure.

During the 1930s a number of significant changes were made to the grounds of Bishopsbourne. Land fronting Milton and Baroona Roads and Heussler Terrace was subdivided and sold, reducing the area to 12 acres (4.9 ha). Stone terraces along the eastern and western slopes were constructed, using relief labour. These were planted with shrubs, annuals and a bougainvillea hedge, but have been largely grassed over since.

In 1936 St Francis' Theological College was transferred from Nundah to the grounds of Bishopsbourne, where a wooden dormitory and classroom building was constructed. Two brick and concrete structures were erected for the College in 1959, one being the vice-principal's residence and the other an award-winning library.

Some restoration work at Bishopsbourne was undertaken in 1962, particularly of the cedar joinery. However, in 1964 Archbishop Philip Strong moved to Eldernell (formerly Farsley) at 39 Eldernell Terrace, Hamilton, which became the new Bishopsbourne, and the former See house at Milton became part of St Francis' Theological College. The 1860s core was refurbished as the principal's residence, and the 1880s service wing was converted into quarters for the vice-principal.

During the 1980s, pressure for increased student accommodation resulted in the construction of a number of two-storeyed, brick, semi-detached townhouses in the grounds of St Francis' Theological College. A new timber administration building and a set of timber townhouses were constructed in the early 1990s.

In April 2007, Archbishop Phillip Aspinall sold the Hamilton Bishopsbourne for $11.2 million and moved to a residence in Ascot costing $2.6 million, which has also been renamed Bishopsbourne.

== Description ==
Old Bishopsbourne is a large, two-storeyed residence constructed of local porphyry and sandstone. The style is a blend of derived and vernacular elements.

On both floors, French casement windows with fanlights open from the main rooms onto wide verandahs, which are enclosed externally by Gothic stone arches, creating a cloistered atmosphere. The second storey verandah balustrade is constructed of cast iron fashioned in an inverted arch pattern.

The hipped roof is slated with four tall chimney-stacks. Small louvred gablets ventilate the roof.

Internally the sandstock brickwork is cement rendered and lime plastered, with little ornamentation. All the internal joinery, including 10-foot (3.0 m) high folding doors which retract into the walls, is of Queensland red cedar.

The ground floor comprises a small vestibule separated by a cedar and etched glass screen from a broad hallway running the length of the house; three rooms to the right used for drawing room and study functions; three rooms to the left which open to one large dining area; an enclosed section of the front verandah which now contains a bathroom; and a modern kitchen at the rear.

The upstairs has been converted into the principal's quarters, containing six bedrooms, two bathrooms, a lounge and a kitchen.

A two-storeyed brick and stone annexe with a corrugated iron roof, formerly the service wing, is attached at the rear. The iron balustrade pattern of the main building is repeated around the annexe verandahs, the lower level of which incorporates a deep timber valance.

Underneath both the main building and the annexe are large cellars, intended originally as larders and storage space.

While an ongoing building programme has resulted in substantial changes to the site, sufficient grounds and mature trees remain to sustain the garden setting ambience, and the residence itself remains largely intact. The 1870s gateposts survive, but only fragments of the early garden beds. The 1930s stone terracing survives.

Other significant buildings within the grounds include:

- Old Bishopsbourne Chapel (1912), a Gothic style, gable-roofed stone building
- the 1936 St Francis' Theological College Building, a gable-roofed and verandahed, interwar hostel-type timber building
- St Francis' Theological College Library Building (1959), a postwar International style brick, concrete and glass structure with ecclesiastical undertones.

The endeavours by successive architects to incorporate gable and arch motifs within their contemporary designs has created a sense of harmony within the grounds.

== Heritage listing ==
Old Bishopsbourne was listed on the Queensland Heritage Register on 21 October 1992 having satisfied the following criteria.

The place is important in demonstrating the evolution or pattern of Queensland's history.

Old Bishopsbourne (St Francis Theological College) and its substantial grounds, which include early garden fragments, early gateposts, a 1912 Robin Dods designed stone chapel, 1930s terracing and a number of buildings associated with St Francis Theological College (from 1936), is significant historically as one of the oldest ecclesiastical precincts in Queensland.

Old Bishopsbourne, a purpose-designed See house constructed 1865–68, is significant historically for its strong association with the mid-19th century consolidation of the Anglican Church in Queensland, and with the Anglican Bishops and Archbishops of Brisbane for nearly a century.

The place is important in demonstrating the principal characteristics of a particular class of cultural places.

Old Bishopsbourne is an accomplished and aesthetically appealing building with a simplicity of design and austerity of decoration which reflect its function and purpose as an ecclesiastical residence. It is important as a major work by prominent architect Benjamin Backhouse, and one of the more intact of his surviving Brisbane works.

The 1936 theological college accommodation and lecture room building is a good example of interwar hostel-type accommodation, and the award-winning 1959 college library building is a fine example of International style in Brisbane.

The place is important because of its aesthetic significance.

Old Bishopsbourne is a Milton landmark, still visible in the western vista from Petrie Terrace.

The place is important in demonstrating a high degree of creative or technical achievement at a particular period.

The 1936 theological college accommodation and lecture room building is a good example of interwar hostel-type accommodation, and the award-winning 1959 college library building is a fine example of International style in Brisbane.

The place has a special association with the life or work of a particular person, group or organisation of importance in Queensland's history.

The place has had a strong association with the work of the Anglican Church in Queensland for over 130 years, and each of the buildings in the grounds illustrates further consolidation of the Anglican church in this state.
