= Frank Backhouse =

Australian mining engineer

Frank Herbert Backhouse (1863–1933) was a mining engineer during the Western Australian gold rushes of the 1890s.

== Early years ==
Backhouse was born in Brisbane, Queensland, in 1863. His father was Benjamin Backhouse, member of the New South Wales Legislative Council; his brother Alfred Paxton Backhouse was a judge of the District Court of New South Wales. He received commercial and scientific instruction at the Grammar School and The King's School, Sydney-based institutions which prepared students for university.

He matriculated in science at the University of Sydney, after which he was appointed assistant professor to Mr. W. A. Dixon, F.I.C., Professor of the Chair of Chemistry in the Sydney Technical College. For eighteen months he assisted Dixon in scientific research in the laboratory. His duties included delivering a course of lectures to the students of the college on metallurgy, and demonstration in the laboratory.

== Assayer and metallurgist ==
His first extra-academic appointment was as assayer to the Sunny Corner Silver and Gold Mine in the Bathurst district. He was there but a short time when he left to become assistant manager of the Australian K.O. and M. Company, Joadja Creek, Mittagong. Here his extensive knowledge of both inorganic and organic chemistry proved a remunerative boon to the company, as he introduced cheaper and more convenient methods of treatment. However, he preferred assaying and returned to Sunny Corner as Government Assayer. He was there nine months when he proceeded to the Evelyn Silver Mine, in the Northern Territory, as an assayer and metallurgist. On this mine he assayed for twelve months, and then resolved to exploit the Kimberley region in Western Australia.

The Kimberley goldfields had been opened up six months before, and were reported as being inconceivably rich. He started prospecting. Success, however, was moderate, and he returned to Sydney in 1889, and accepted the post of metallurgist in the Kohinoor Mine at Captain's Flat, near Braidwood. He went from there to the White Rock Mine in the Tenterfield district. Then he took the management of the Clyde Smelting and Refining Works at Granville—very large and important works belonging to the Hudson Brothers. His next role was the managerial trust of the Nambucca's Head Gold Mine, situated in the Macleay district.

== Return to Western Australia ==
He returned to Western Australia in August, 1893, and immediately after his arrival, started practice in Perth as a mining and consulting engineer. His scientific reputation was the means of his obtaining a considerable practice. His counsel and opinion were sought for continually in mining matters, and he gradually gained a business connection with leading mining companies.

The West Australian Goldfields, Limited, was the pioneer of English companies in Coolgardie. Its directors had entered into some large mining transactions, and invited Backhouse to accept the managership of their mines. The company flourished and paid good dividends during his managerial tenure. The company, which was floated on the London market by member of the Western Australian Legislative Council Henry Saunders, had possession of extensive real estate and various properties that necessitated Backhouse travelling over large portions of the colony. In his twin capacity of manager and overseer, he inspected and took accurate bearings and measurements of all the different properties. A series of flotations by the company early took place in rapid succession: the White Feather Reward Mine, Mount Jackson Gold Mine, Mount Margaret Reward Claim, the Princess Alice, the Quartz Hill Reward, and the Yerilla Gold mines. The subsidiary companies now owning these invested large capital in them, and add the degree of "limited" after their names. As offshoots from the parent company, Backhouse would give them advice, of a scientific or mechanical nature.

Blackhouse made acute and observant reports and scientific accounts of the physical features of the country during his traversals, which includes all the gold fields of the interior; his extensive geological and chemical knowledge made them authoritative. He was the first mining engineer in Coolgardie to perform the journey from Coolgardie to Lake Way through the Murchison goldfields to Geraldton.

== Personal life and appointments ==
Backhouse met his wife in Coolgardie, in the early 1890s. Born in Hill End, New South Wales, she was the daughter of John King Weir, and sister to J. K. and Alf Weir, both of whom were involved in the development of the Western Australian goldfields. Backhouse built his home Ithaca in 1897, as well as several other cottages, on land he acquired in Busselton. They had two sons and a daughter, the youngest born c. 1899. While Backhouse travelled across the state for his work, his wife resided in Busselton, until her death in 1911.

In 1895 Backhouse was elected a councillor of the Municipality of Coolgardie. He was involved with various corporate bodies. In 1896, he held the honorary position of vice-president of the Coolgardie Chamber of Mines and Commerce. Despite Backhouse's flood of business he found time for patronising various kinds of sport, including as vice-president of The Rugby Football Club of Coolgardie and as patron or honorary office-bearer of various others.

In 1920 he was appointed a Justice of the Peace for the Yilgarn district, and by 1928 he was chairman of Ravensthorpe Hospital's board.

== Death ==
Backhouse died on 12 April 1933, in Bridgetown. His remains were interred in the Bridgetown cemetery.
