= Government House, Brisbane =

Residence of the governor of Queensland

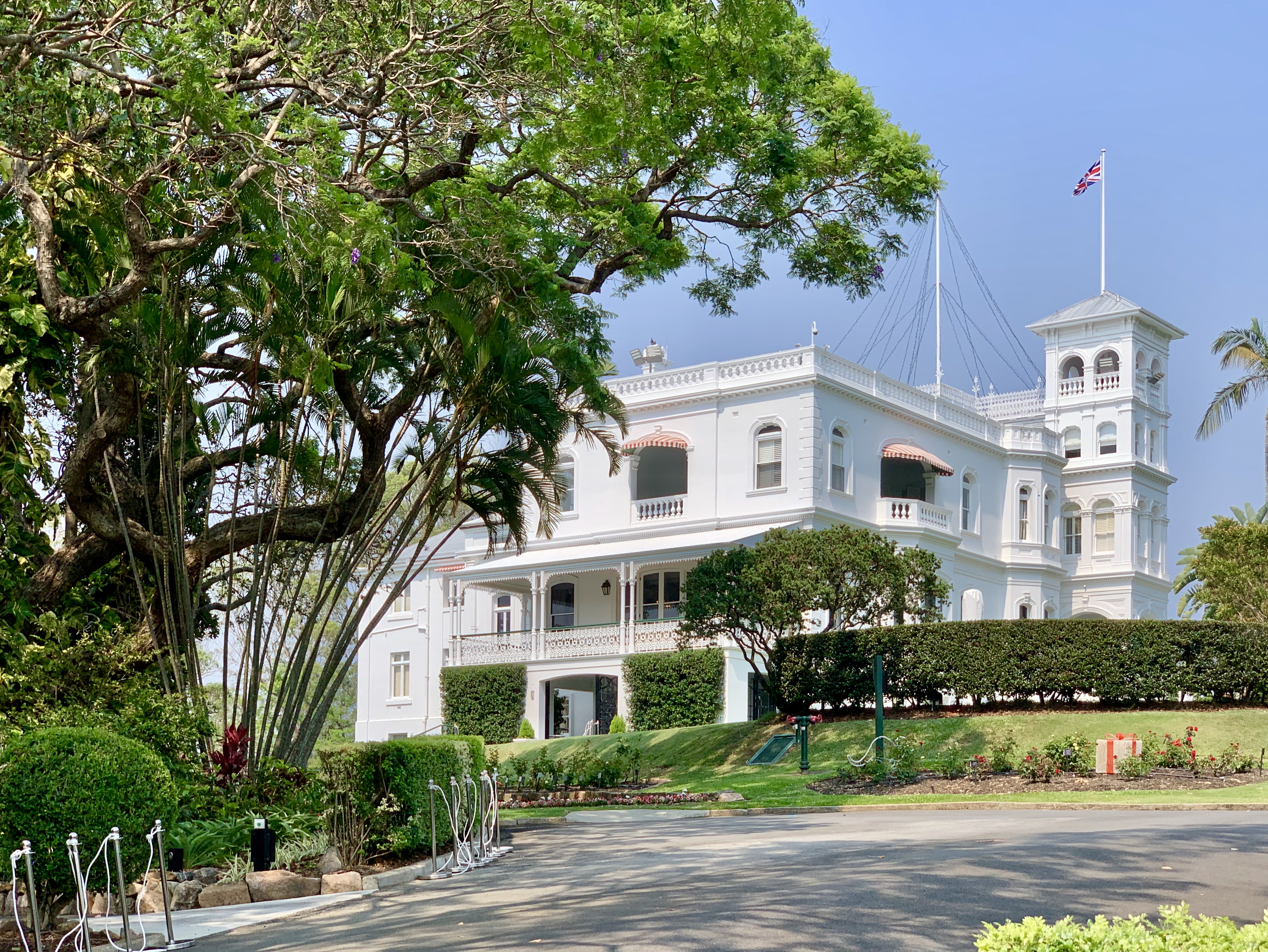
- Government House, 2019

- Location within Queensland
- 27.4631°S 152.9908°E
- Location: 170 Fernberg Road, Paddington, Brisbane, Queensland, Australia

History
- Design period: 1840s–1860s (mid-19th century)
- Built: 1865
- Built for: Johann Heussler

Site notes
- Architect: Benjamin Backhouse
- Architectural style: Italianate
- Owner: Government of Queensland

Queensland Heritage Register
- Official name: Government House, Fernberg
- Type: state heritage (landscape, built)
- Designated: 21 October 1992
- Reference no.: 600275
- Significant period: 1860s–1950s (fabric); 1860s–1890s; 1910 (historical)
- Significant components: garden/grounds, office/administration building, basement / sub-floor, lodge, swimming pool, wall/s – retaining, natural landscape, steps/stairway, lawn/s, driveway, tennis court, residential accommodation – staff quarters, tower – observation/lookout, views to, garage, garden – ornamental/flower, residential accommodation – main house, views from, trees/plantings, residential accommodation – staff housing, pathway/walkway, stained glass window/s

Government House is a heritage-listed mansion at 170 Fernberg Road, Paddington, Brisbane, Queensland, Australia. It is the official residence of the governor of Queensland, the representative of the Australian monarch in Queensland. It was originally designed by Benjamin Backhouse and built 1865, but has been subsequently extended and refurbished. It is also known as Fernberg. It was added to the Queensland Heritage Register on 21 October 1992.

The premier of Queensland must visit the governor at Government House to request the dissolution of the Queensland Legislative Assembly and the calling of a general election. Following the outcome of such elections, the governor appoints the premier and ministry and the swearing-in of Members of the Legislative Assembly which also takes place at Government House.

Government House is open to the general public on certain open days, usually around Queensland Day, 6 June and as part of Brisbane Open House in October. Free public tours for members of the public also run on the first Thursday of each month, while community and schools groups can request tours every Wednesday and Thursday.

== History ==
The land on which the Government House stands was originally granted as two separate portions. Portion 223 was bought in May 1860 by Johann Christian Heussler, who also purchased the adjoining portion 291 two years later in partnership with George Reinhard Francksen. In 1864 Francksen died and the land passed to Heussler. At that time the landscape in this outlying suburb of Brisbane may have been close to undeveloped natural bushland.

The Hon Johann (John) Christian Heussler, 1820–1907, was a native of Germany who emigrated to Victoria, Australia in 1852. Due to poor health he moved to Brisbane 1854 and established the mercantile firm Heussler and Co. Over two decades Heussler became a highly respected business man and citizen of Queensland. He was recognised as a founding member of the Queensland Club, Consul for the Netherlands, German Consul, and Emigration Agent for German shipping companies. In 1866 he was appointed to the Queensland Legislative Council.

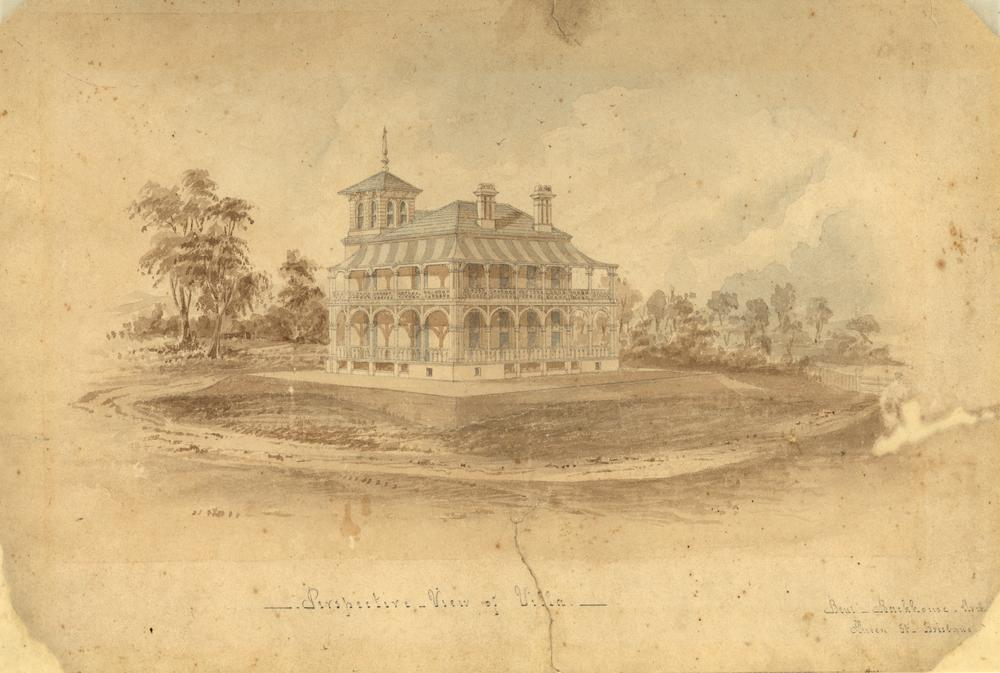
Perspective drawing of Villa Fernberg by Benjamin Backhouse, circa 1864

Heussler commissioned Brisbane architect Benjamin Backhouse to design a residence for himself, which was constructed in 1865.

Heussler named his home Fernberg, giving it a name of German origin that meant "distant mountain". Benjamin Backhouse was an architect responsible for several substantial commissions in Queensland, New South Wales and Victoria. Local examples of his work include other villa residences such as Baroona, Cintra House, Riversleigh and Old Bishopsbourne.

Due to financial difficulties, Heussler was forced to leave the property by 1871 after which it was leased to Arthur Palmer, then the Premier of Queensland. In November 1877, the estate was advertised for sale; the house and grounds were described as being:

"The house is built of brick and stone, being four stories high, having below kitchen and servants' room; on the ground floor spacious drawing, dining, and breakfast rooms; on the first floor three large bedrooms, and one large room on the second floor. The roof is covered with slates, the verandahs and balconies being spacious, and presenting a delightful retreat for the enjoyment of pure air, shade, and widespread and charming view. The whole of the internal and external workmanship and materials are of the very best description, and the out-offices are replete with every necessary. The stable contains a great many stalls. There is also carriage-house, storeroom, groom's room, harness-room, &c, &c."

"The grounds are all enclosed, the timber having been thinned so as to give the place a park-like appearance, and there is a shrubbery and garden round the house. The Enoggera water pipes run through the property so that there is an abundant supply of water in all seasons. The view from Fernberg is something out of the common, both for extent, variety, and beauty; and one of the best proofs that can be adduced in favor of this assertion is the fact that, go where you will the house is seen towering aloft above every tenement in the neighborhood."

The property was transferred to George and Nathan Cohen in 1878, neither of whom resided in the house.

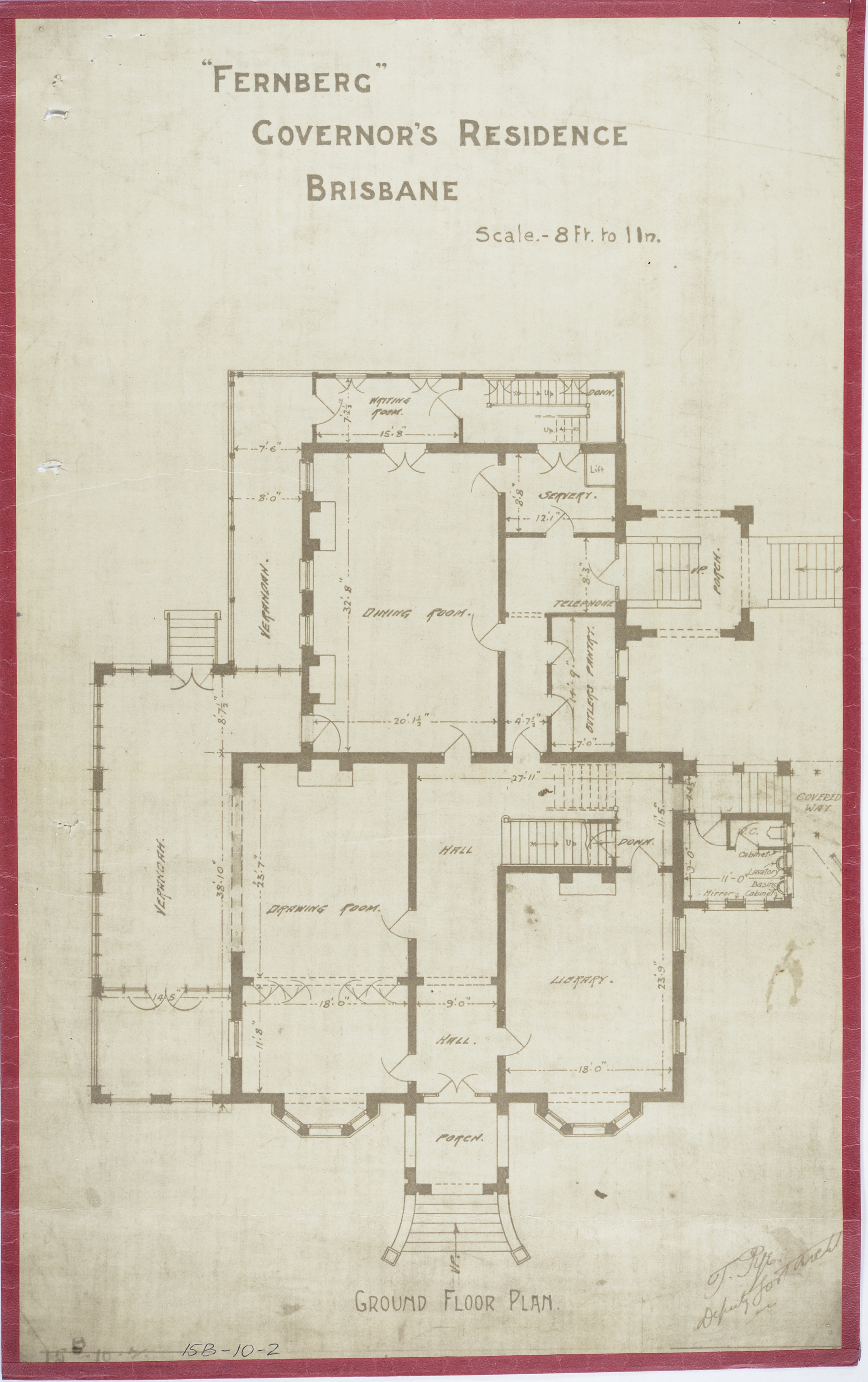
Ground Floor Plan, c 1884

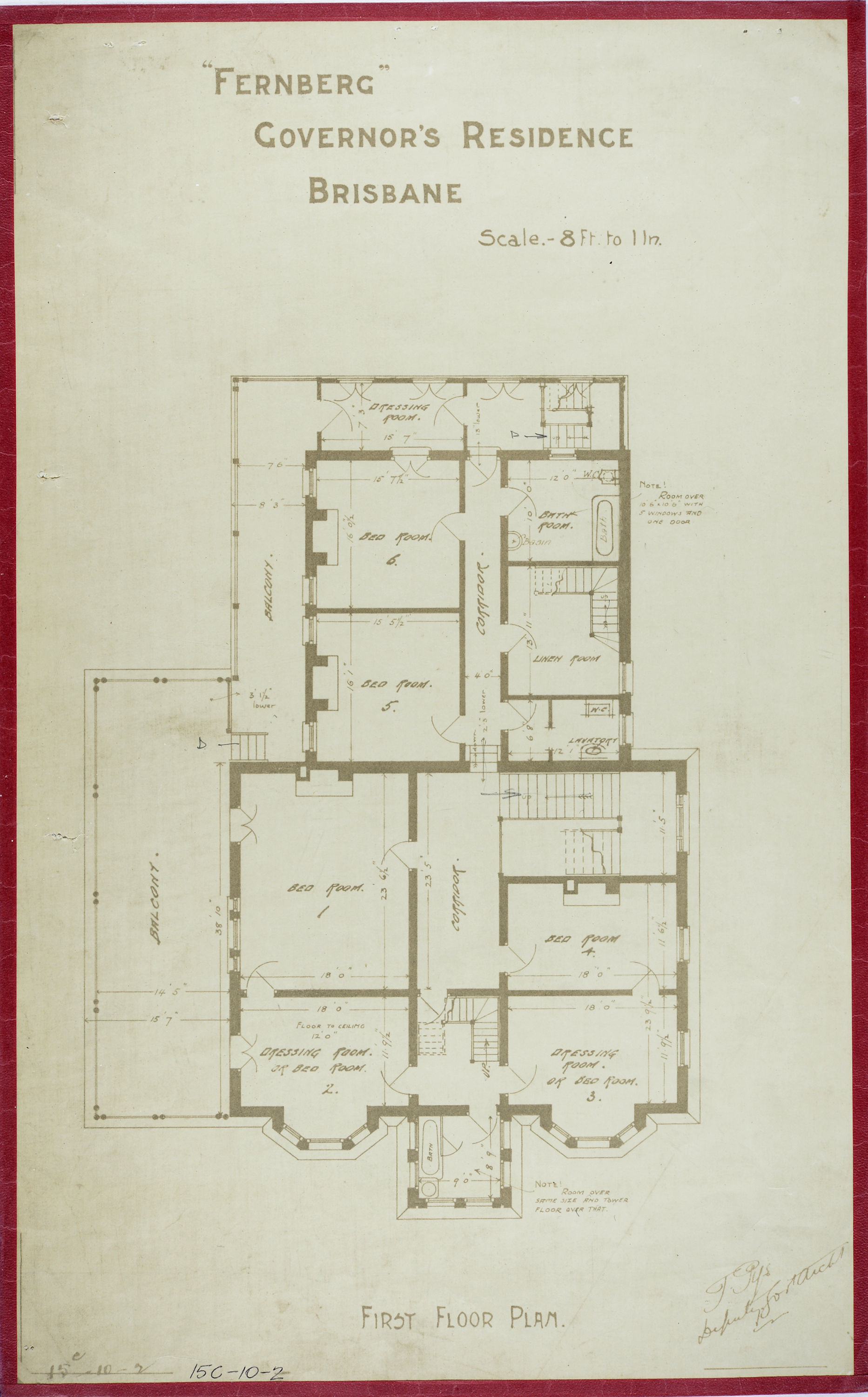
First Floor Plan, c 1884

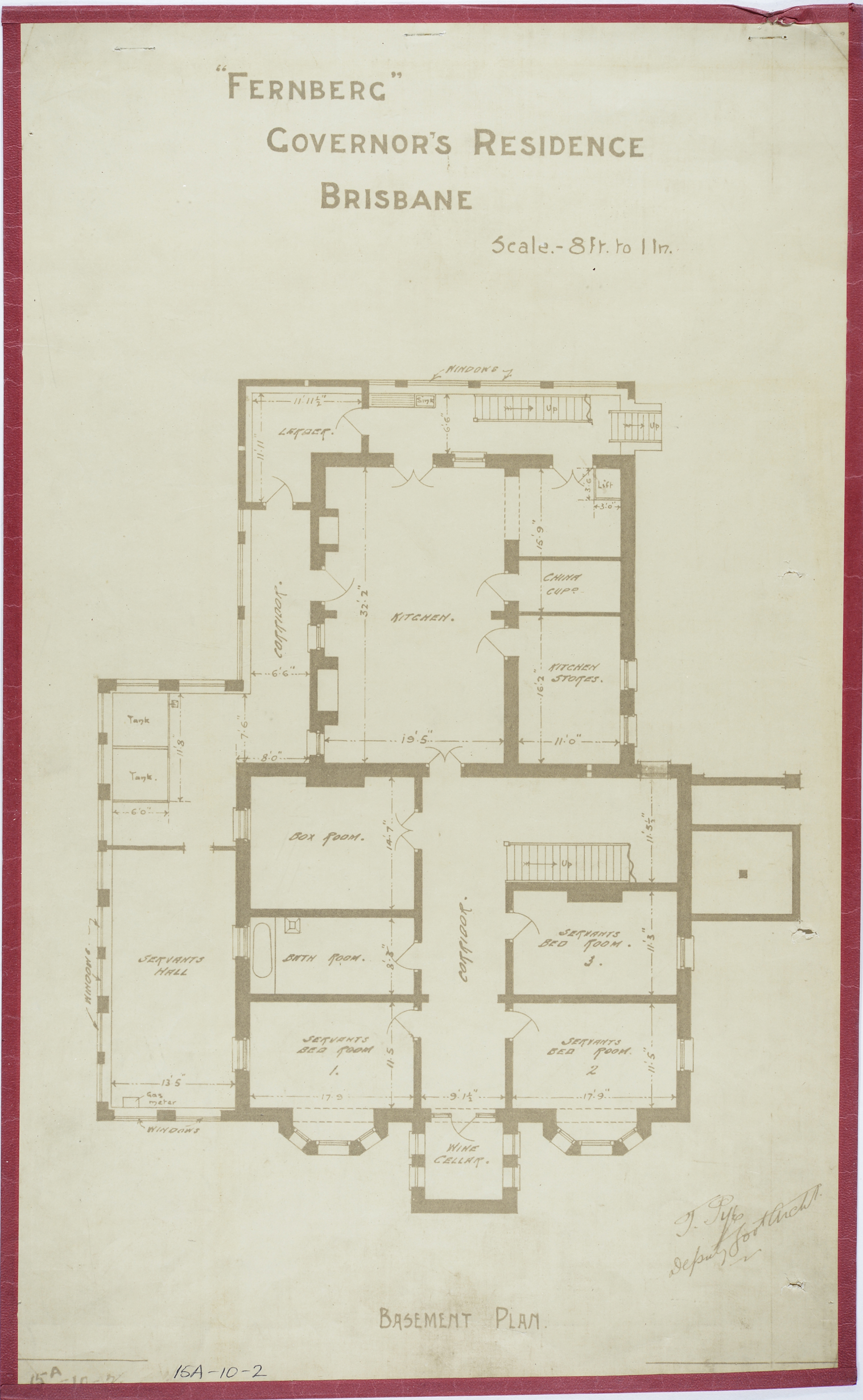
Basement plan, circa 1884

John Stevenson, a successful pastoralist, stock and station agent and a Member of the Queensland Legislative Assembly, bought Fernberg in the mid-1880s and commissioned architect, Richard Gailey in 1888 to design extensive additions and alterations to the house. The scheme was a major undertaking which more than doubled the size of the original house, and altered the building from an 1860s villa to an Italianate Mansion. The new section had stuccoed detailing, faceted bays and the main entrance was orientated northwards and marked by a tower. These additions made the residence very close to the road; however following the "straightening" of Fernberg Road, the original road became the driveway. The road was transformed into a winding avenue that led to both the front and side entrances. In 1890 a fountain, gates and gate pillars were erected in the grounds that were well established with trees and shrubs. Various other outbuildings and structures were also developed on the property and included: a coach house, five stall stable, harness room, tool room, man's room, laundry, gymnasium, aviary, fowl house, closets, bush house, glass house and asphalt tennis court. The 1890s economic depression brought an end to Stevenson's fortune and by 1895 the property was mortgaged to William Pattison and Walter Russell Hall. Two years later Hall, a well-known philanthropist who had made his fortune from gold at Mount Morgan, took possession of the residence; however, he chose never to live at the property.

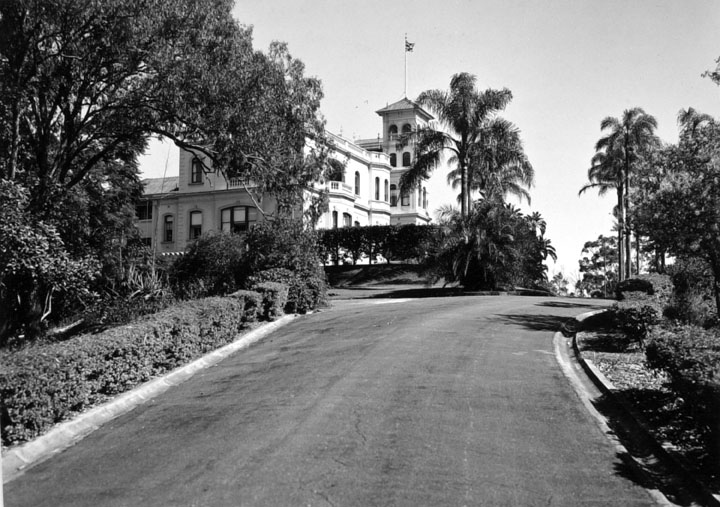
View of Government House along main drive, 1950

The decision to lease Fernberg as a temporary Vice-regal residence was made in February 1910 following the formal dedication on 10 December 1909 of the original Government House as Queensland's first university, the University of Queensland. At the same time, plans for a new Government House to be erected at Victoria Park were being prepared; however work on the new House never progressed beyond the construction of footings. In June 1911, despite reports that Fernberg was too small, the government purchased Fernberg as a permanent government house. Alterations and renovations carried out immediately included painting, new floor coverings, the installation of electric light, metalling, gravelling, and rolling of roadways and fencing. Several buildings from the former Government House site were moved to Fernberg in 1910–11 to provide accommodation for offices, a billiard room and apartments for the private secretary and aide-de-camp. A lodge and servants' quarters were also relocated to the site. A chauffeur's cottage was built in 1923, and a commodious timber garage erected in 1935.

Formal gardens were initially developed in 1910, primarily for the purpose of providing functional spaces for Vice-Regal garden parties and fund-raising events. Generally the selection of plant material in these garden areas was exotic, mostly ornamental and some native trees. Surrounding the gardens was the original bushland that covered about 70% of the entire grounds. In comparison to the formal gardens, the bushland received very little attention except for the successive clearing of the understorey plants and later of sapling and shrub regrowth. In 1928 "woodland walks" were created by Governor Sir John and Lady Goodwin through the bushland behind Government House. Paths were created, foot bridges constructed and various plants introduced, such as jacarandas, wattles and poinsettias.

In September 1936, suggestions to relocate the Governor back to the original residence were raised by the then Governor, Sir Leslie Wilson. Despite serious consideration, the Premier and Cabinet rejected the idea and instead proposed substantial additions to Fernberg, thus settling the issue of a permanent Government House. Governor and Lady Wilson were both intimately involved in the plans for additions that were designed by the Department of Public Works. The extent of the 1937 additions included construction of a new eastern wing that contained a large reception room, billiards and supper room and a new bedroom with ensuite. To give coherency to the entire building, the entire exterior of Fernberg was painted cream. New maids' quarters and a laundry were built separate to the main house.

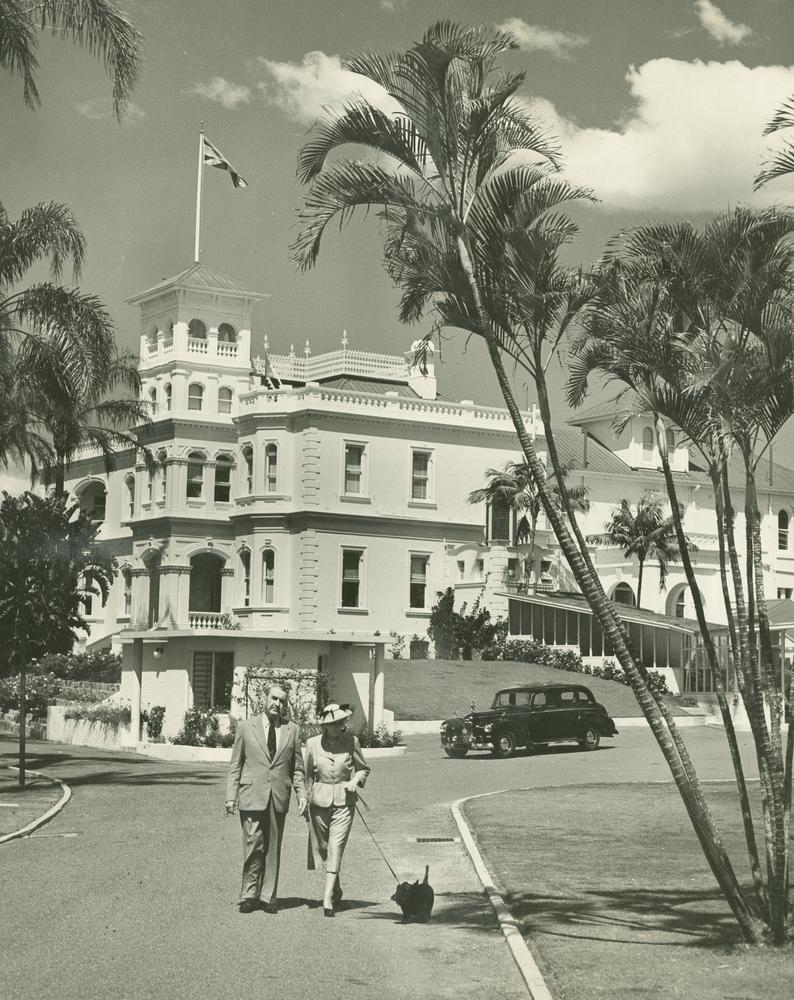
Sir John and Lady Lavarack walking along the drive of Fernberg with their scotty dog, Monty, 1947

Minor internal alterations were carried out on Fernberg in the mid-1940s after a change of Governor and in anticipation of visits by various members of the Royal Family (Prince Henry, Duke of Gloucester having been appointed as Governor-General of Australia in January 1945). Pressure for additional accommodation for the Governor's private staff in the late 1940s resulted in the construction of a single storied brick Auxiliary Building. This building replaced the earlier timber building that had been relocated onto the site in 1910 and was subsequently moved to another site in Bardon. In 1950 a brick administration building and a new coverway with port cochere were erected. The entire complex was painted white at this time.

In 1953 a balcony with a concrete staircase leading to the ground level was constructed, opening off the reception room. Doors and windows in the billiards rooms were altered so that they opened out onto a terrace beneath the balcony.

Additional residences for staff accommodation were introduced in 1959, 1984 and 1986. A tennis court and swimming pool were built in 1959–1960. Air conditioning services were first introduced in 1957 and were extended in 1978. Refurbishment of the original section of Fernberg, referred to as the guest wing, was carried out in 1981–82. A new guard house was constructed in 1987 and substantial internal works involving the refurbishment of the reception areas were also carried out in the same year. The main house underwent major external refurbishment and painting again in 1992.

Late in 1992 one hectare of Government House grounds was taken over by the Department of Transport as part of the widening of Kaye Street. The result of these works is the construction of substantial retaining walls along the western perimeter of the property.

=== The Governors ===
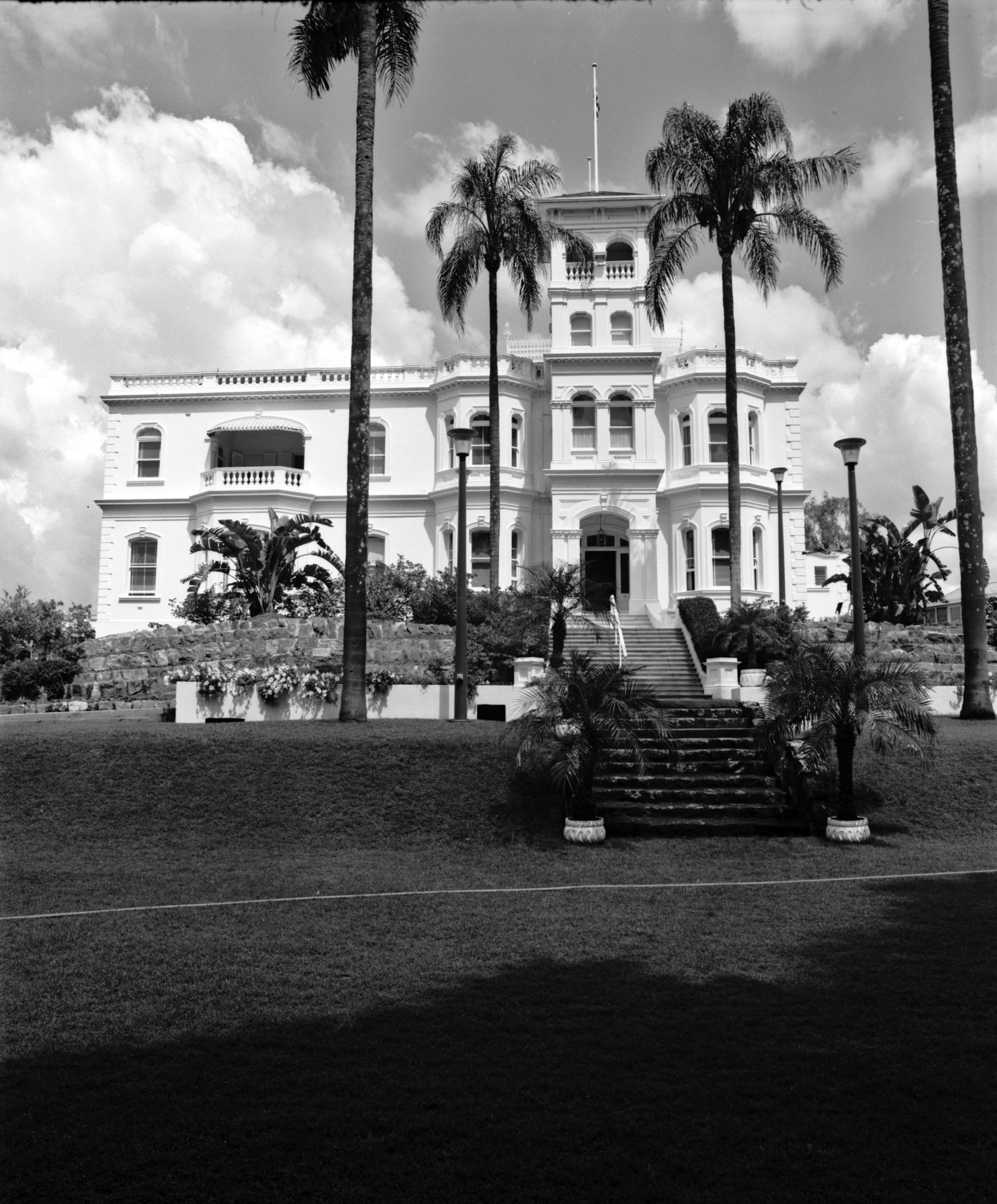
Government House, circa 1981

In the period 1910–37, when Fernberg was considered a temporary Government House, it served as the home for five Governors:

- 1909–1914 Sir William MacGregor, Scottish born governor who signed the University Act providing the newly inaugurated University of Queensland with a home at Old Government House. He reputedly chose Fernberg because of the grounds in which it stood.
- 1915–1920 Sir Hamilton John Goold-Adams, Irish born governor who played a prominent role in Queensland's politics during his appointment.
- 1920–1925 Sir Matthew Nathan
- 1927–1932 Sir Thomas Herbert John Chapman Goodwin
- 1932–1946 Sir Leslie Orme Wilson, Queensland's longest serving governor who prompted major additions to Fernberg.

Following the declaration of Fernberg as the permanent Government House, the following Governors have resided at the property:

- 1946–1957 Sir John Lavarack, first Australian born governor
- 1958–1966 Sir Henry Abel Smith, Queensland's last English born governor
- 1966–1972 Sir Alan Mansfield
- 1972–1977 Sir Colin Hannah
- 1977–1985 Sir James Ramsay
- 1985–1992 Sir Walter Campbell
- 1992–1997 Her Excellency Mrs Leneen Forde, first female governor
- 1997–2003 Major General Peter Arnison
- 2003–2008 Dame Quentin Bryce, later Australia's first female Governor-General
- 2008–2014 Penelope Wensley
- 2014–2021 Paul de Jersey
- 2021- Dr Jeannette Rosita Young

== Description ==
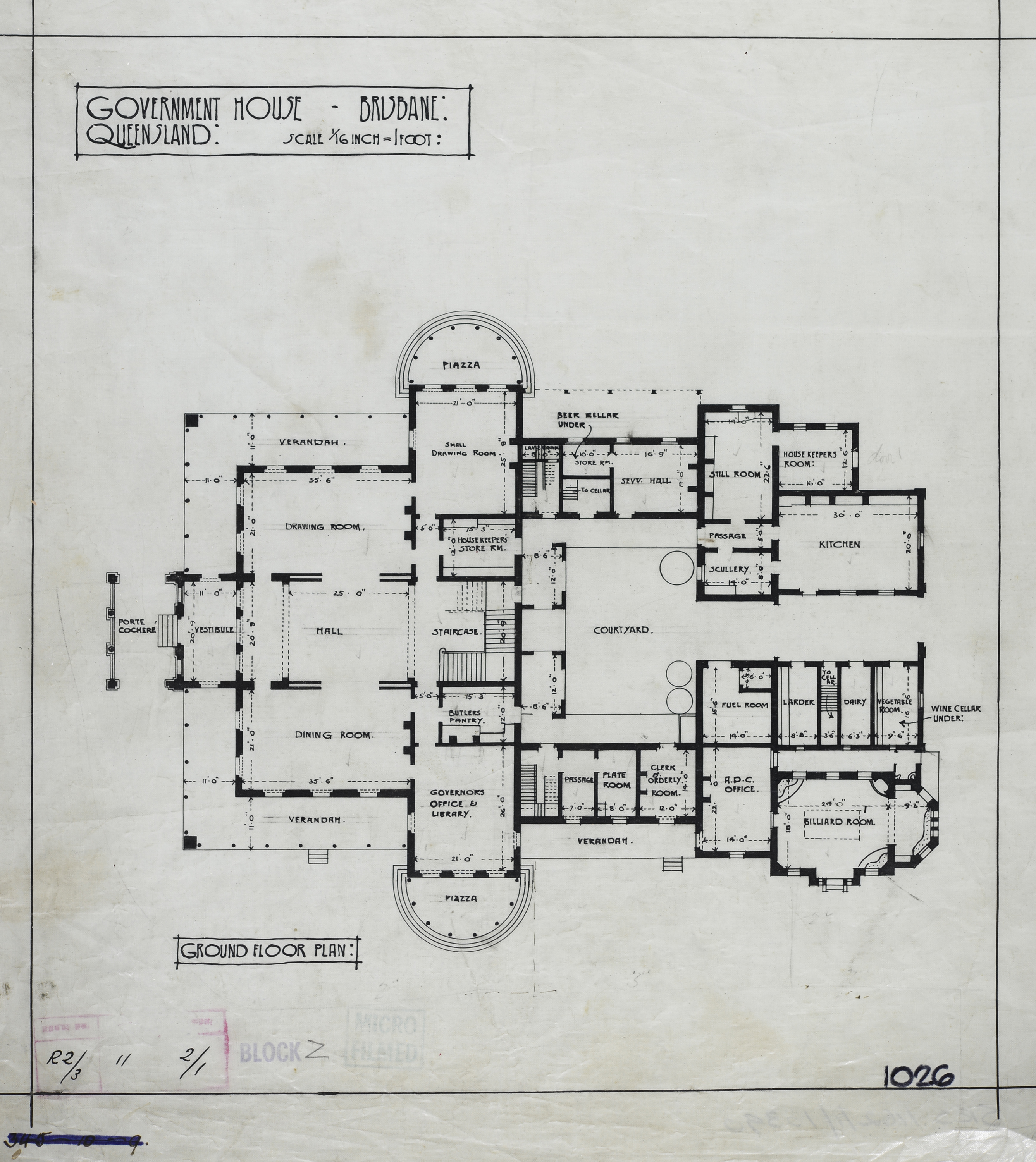
Ground floor plan, circa 1940

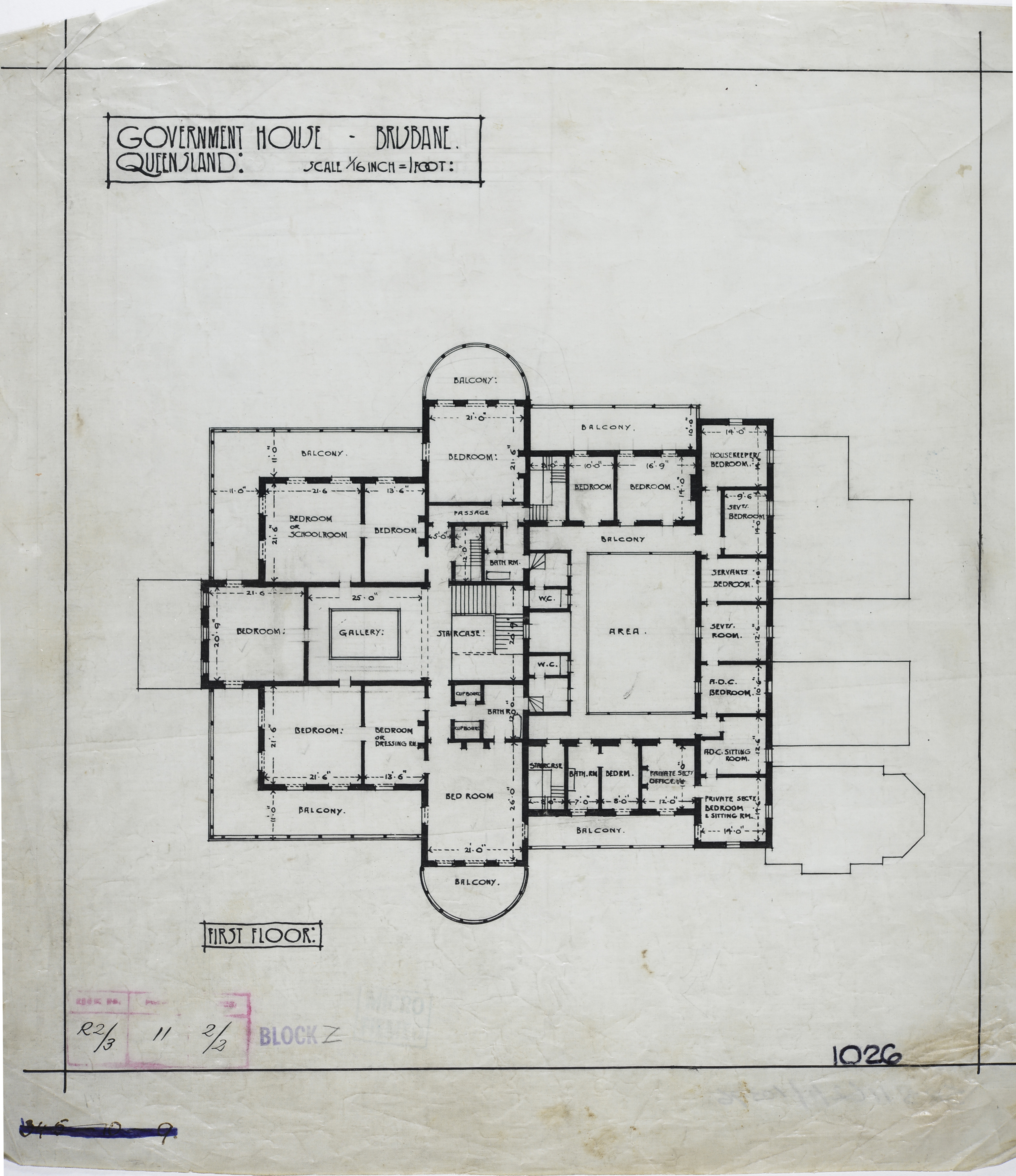
First floor plan, circa 1940

Fernberg is situated on a rise that is approximately 100 metres (330 ft) above sea level overlooking the Brisbane CBD in the south-east and Mount Coot-tha to the west. The 15 hectares (37 acres) of grounds comprise formal, ornamental gardens around the main house, ancillary administration, staff and maintenance buildings, the whole of which is surrounded by native bushland. The site is bounded by Fernberg Road, Kaye Street, Baroona Road and Murruba Street.

=== The Main House ===
Government House is basically a two storied building with a basement level. Stylistically the building demonstrates Victorian Italianate characteristics such as asymmetrical massing, a prominent tower employing classical motifs, a balustraded roof parapet, bracketed eaves, segmental arch openings and a stucco wall finish.

The earliest section of the house is the 1860s wing which is located at the southernmost part of the house. The formal entry to the house is via the 1880s section of the house and the 1937 addition form the eastern wing of the house.

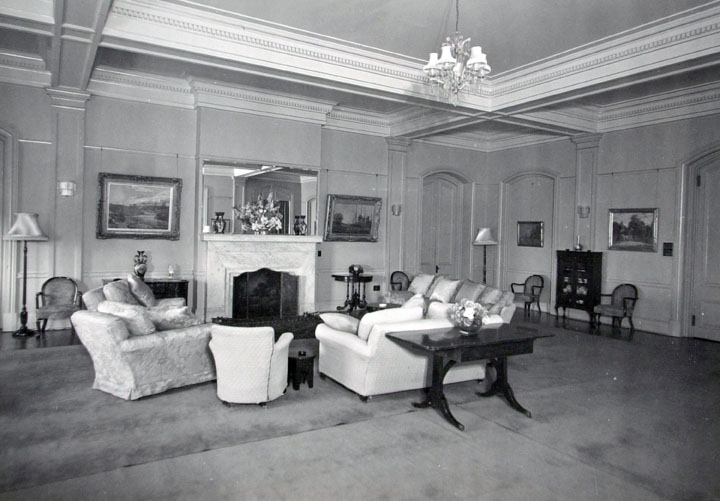
Reception Room, 1950

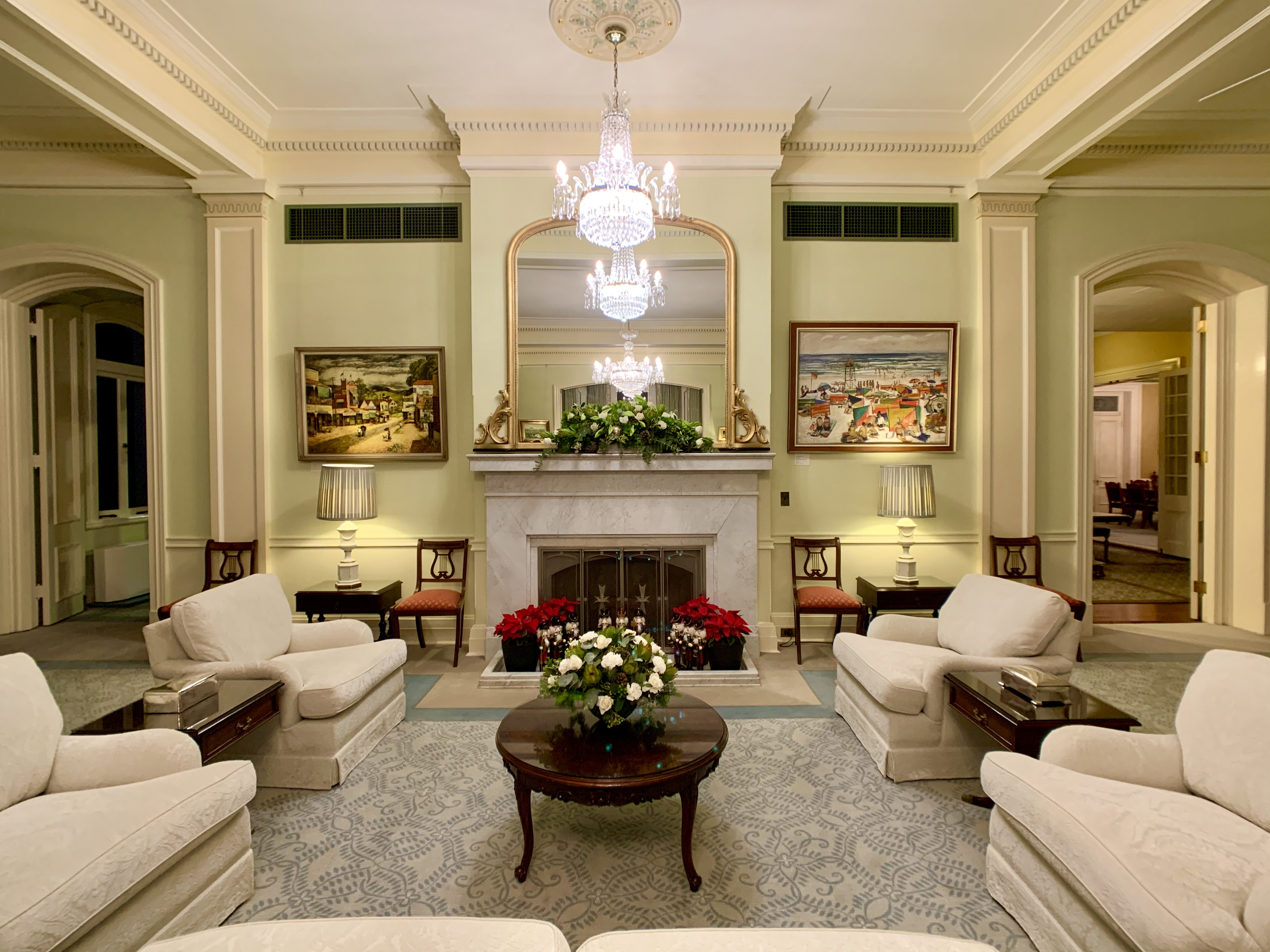
Reception Room, 2019

Internally the main focus of the building is its large central foyer that has a large fireplace, timber panelled dados and an intricately carved timber staircase, over shadowed by a large stained glass window depicting a life size Robert the Bruce. The principal rooms located at ground level are the formal reception and dining rooms, and the governor's study. Each of the rooms is substantially intact; however, their decorative schemes have been subject to several refurbishments. Original furniture from the Old Government House still remains in these rooms.

At the upper level are the private bedrooms of the governor and several guest bedrooms that are located in the southern (earliest) wing of the house. These guest rooms were subject to major renovations in 1981–1982 and currently are furnished to reflect Australian interiors prior to 1900.

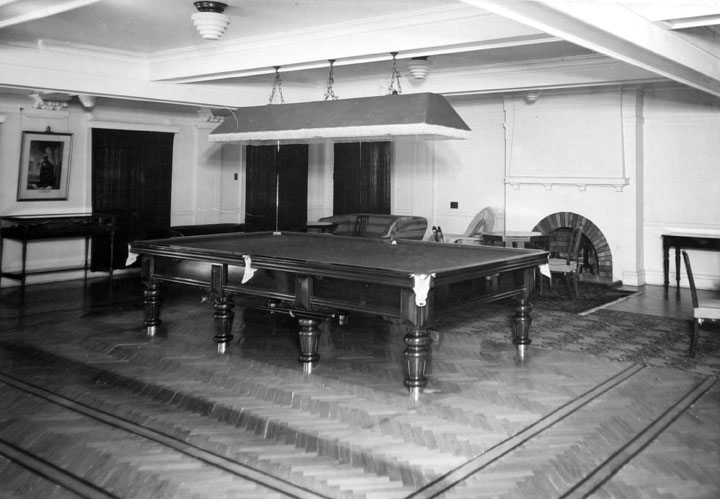
Billiard room, 1950

The principal rooms in the basement level of the house are the investiture room, billiard room, private dining room and the kitchen. The interiors of these areas have been greatly altered and some alterations to the original layout have occurred.

Original joinery, partitions, openings and fittings remain extensively through the entire house.

=== The Grounds ===
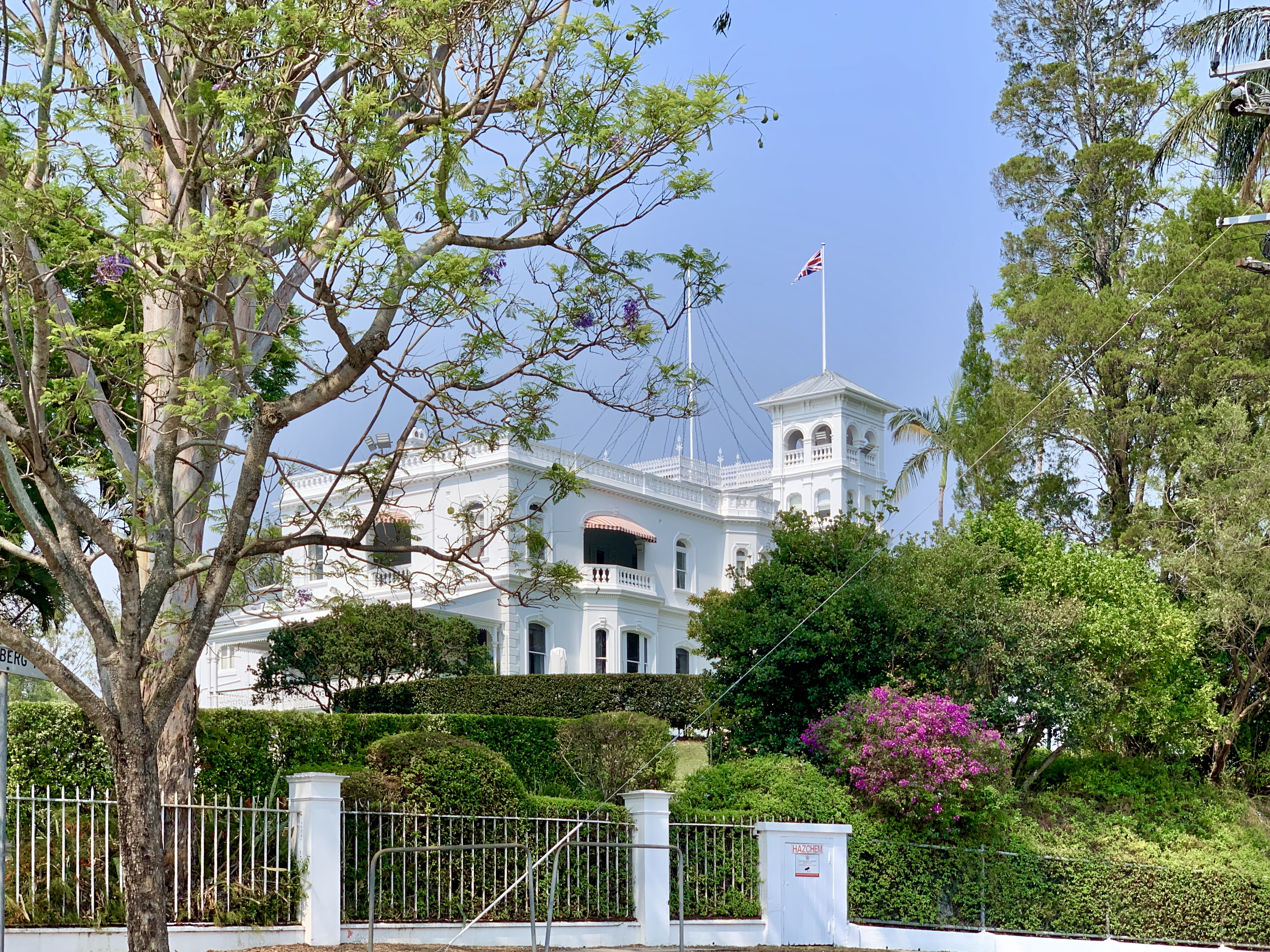
Government House from Fernberg Road

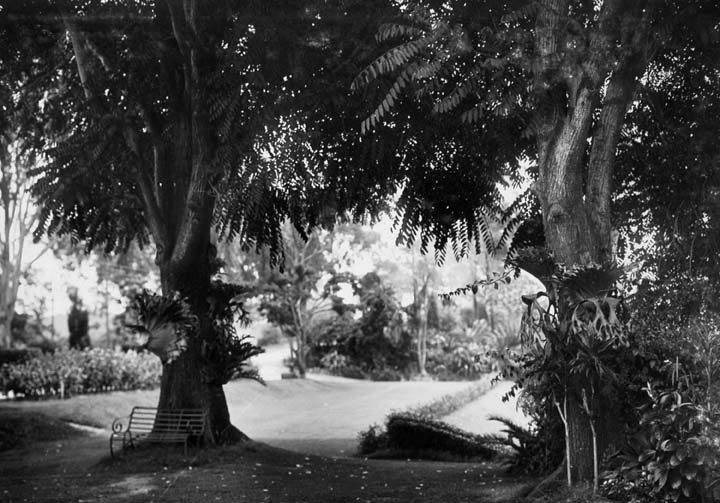
Grounds of Government House, 1928

The Government House grounds consist mainly of two different types of gardens; formal and natural bushland. The formal gardens comprise about 25% of the property with the rest being bushland.

The formal gardens include the developed garden areas as well as the drives, paths, retaining walls and steps. Generally, the selection of plant material in this section is exotic and decorative, with some old remnant native trees. There is extensive use of mown grass surfacing in these areas.

The bushland areas are characterised by the presence of remnant eucalypt forest and the lack of extensive built development. Several paths meander through the area. Several gullies feed into a slightly larger stream in the bottom south-eastern corner.

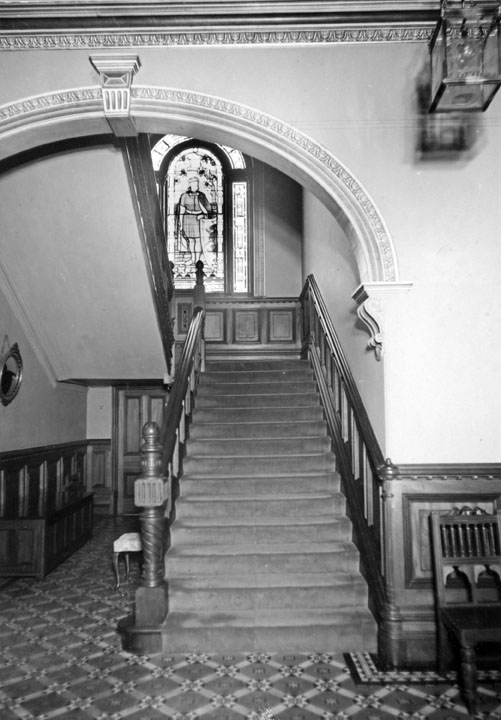
Staircase with stained glass window depicting Robert the Bruce, 1950

=== The Ancillary Buildings ===
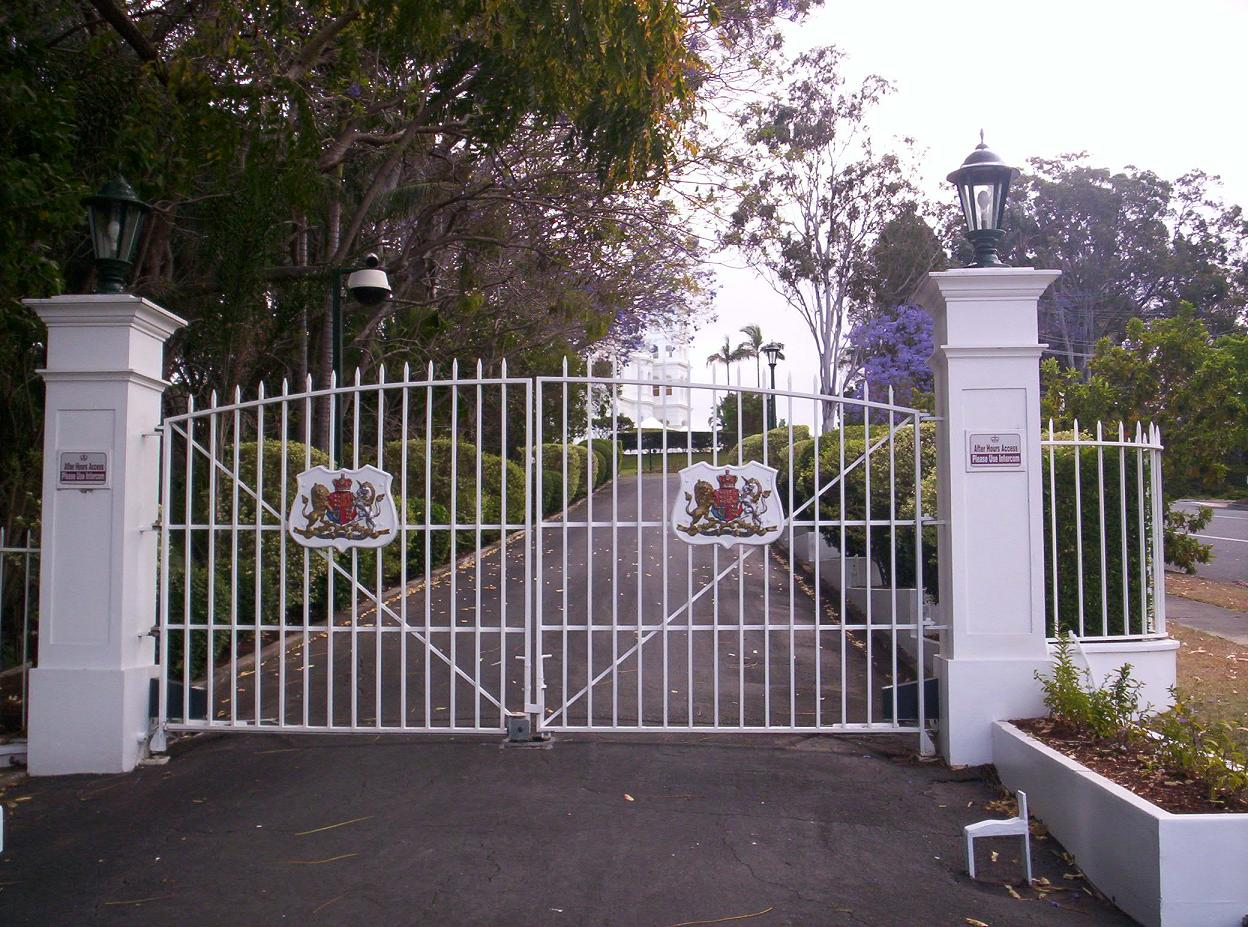
Entrance gates, 2005

The lodge (built before1910, relocated to this site from Old Government House) is a timber building located next to the vice-regal entrance gates. The building, which has two projecting gables, has been extensively altered over a long period of time.

The chauffeur's residence (built 1923) is a spacious timber house with a gabled roof. The building has a verandah attached to two sides and has a faceted bay at the front.

The garages (built 1935) are a timber structure with a galvanised iron roof crown with a fleche and weathervane. The garage contains space for seven cars in three separate rooms, and several other small rooms.

The staff accommodation (built 1937) is a two storied brick and concrete building located south-west of the main house. The building is substantially intact despite several refurbishments.

The administration cottage (built 1948) is a single storied brick building containing several offices, bedrooms and sitting room for the aide-de-camp, the personal assistant to the governor and some guest accommodation.

The gardener's residence (built 1959) is a standard public service D Type residence.

The butler's and the chef's residences (built 1984 and 1986) are recent constructions as are the two staff garages located nearby.

== Heritage listing ==
Government House was listed on the Queensland Heritage Register on 21 October 1992 having satisfied the following criteria.

The place is important in demonstrating the evolution or pattern of Queensland's history.

Government House, Brisbane, demonstrates the evolution of the government in Queensland, and is particularly important as the official residence of the Queensland Governor since 1911, and the place for many vice regal functions including Royal visits. It is the Queensland's symbol of British colonisation of Australia.

The creation of an animal "Sanctuary" and the "Woodland Walks" by Sir John and Lady Goodwin contribute to the early appreciation of native flora and fauna in Queensland.

The place demonstrates rare, uncommon or endangered aspects of Queensland's cultural heritage.

The main house, built in 1865 and originally known as Fernberg, is the only remaining substantial residence and villa estate, of almost original proportions, in Brisbane from the 1860s.

The place is important in demonstrating the principal characteristics of a particular class of cultural places.

The residence, as a result of extensive additions in the 1880s, is regarded among the finest examples of a Victorian Italianate villa in Brisbane. Other buildings built in the grounds following the conversion of the house into a vice regal residence contribute to the understanding of the Governor's role and the complex of necessary auxiliary services.

The place is important because of its aesthetic significance.

Government House is important for its strong aesthetic qualities that symbolise the wealth and influence of its residents. The residence's setting, situated on a wooded hilltop position with a tower, has been a significant landmark since its construction. The layout of the grounds, particularly the formal gardens and the surrounding bushland contribute significantly to the intrinsic character of the property.

The place has a special association with the life or work of a particular person, group or organisation of importance in Queensland's history.

Government House, Bardon has had important associations with the governors of Queensland since 1911. The house and grounds contain evidence of the contribution of each of the vice regal couples and also records the changes that were made for Royal Tours.

The residence is important for its association with several prominent architects who have contributed to the evolution of Government House; Benjamin Backhouse (1865), Richard Gailey (1880s) and the Department of Public Works (1937). The house also has important associations with several early successful settlers in Brisbane. Among these were John Heussler, who built the house in 1865 and was prominent both in business and public life in Queensland and John Stevenson, a pastoralist, stock and station agent and member of the Legislative Assembly, who epitomised the success of the 1880s boom time by changing an 1860s villa to an Italianate Mansion.

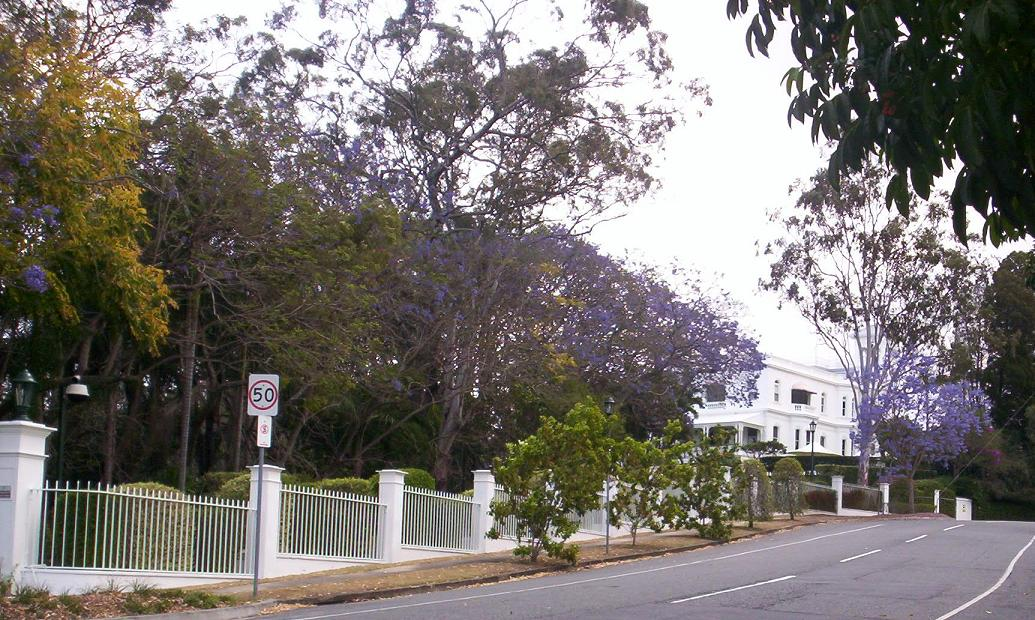
Government House grounds

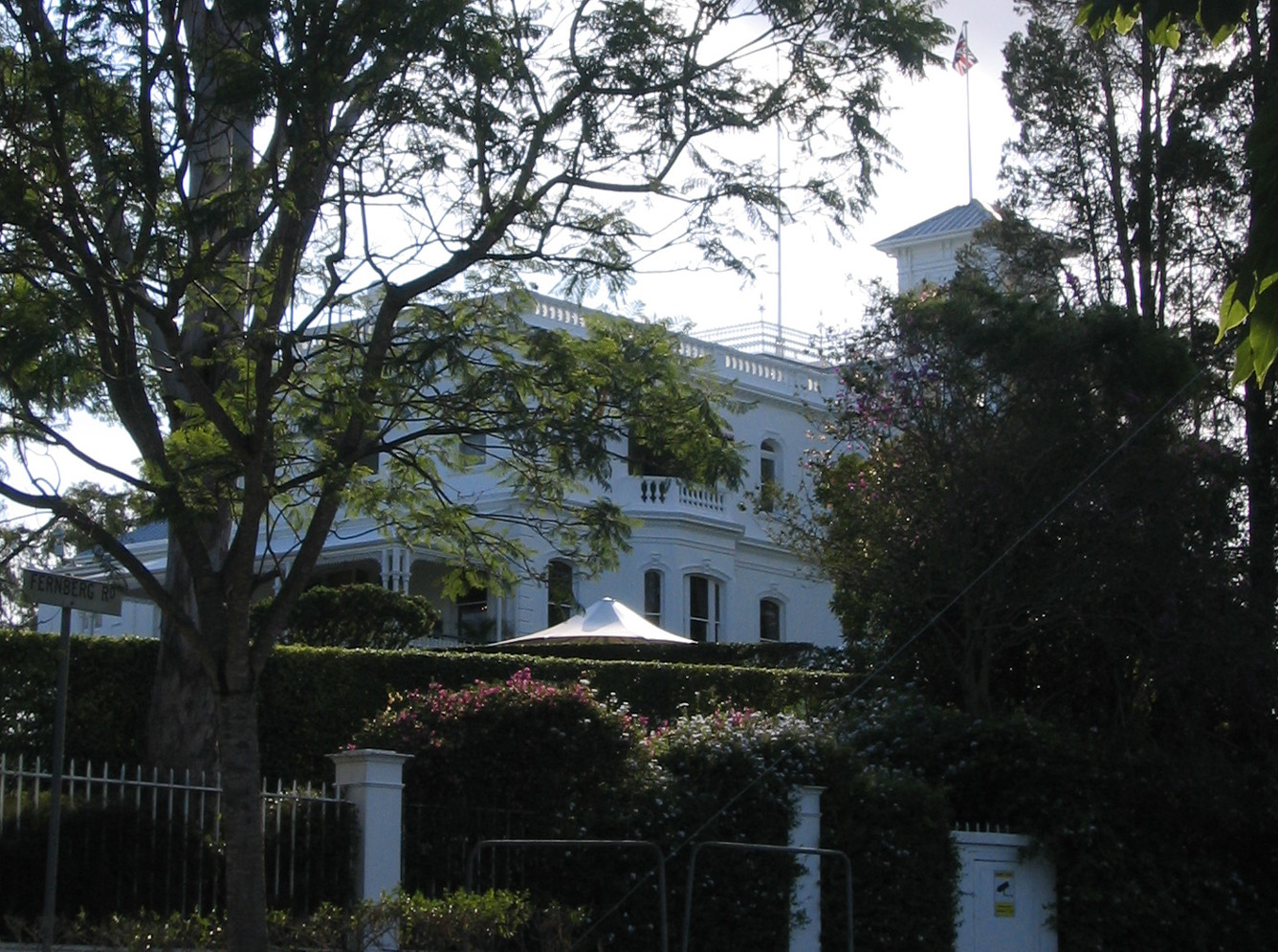
The grounds of Government House

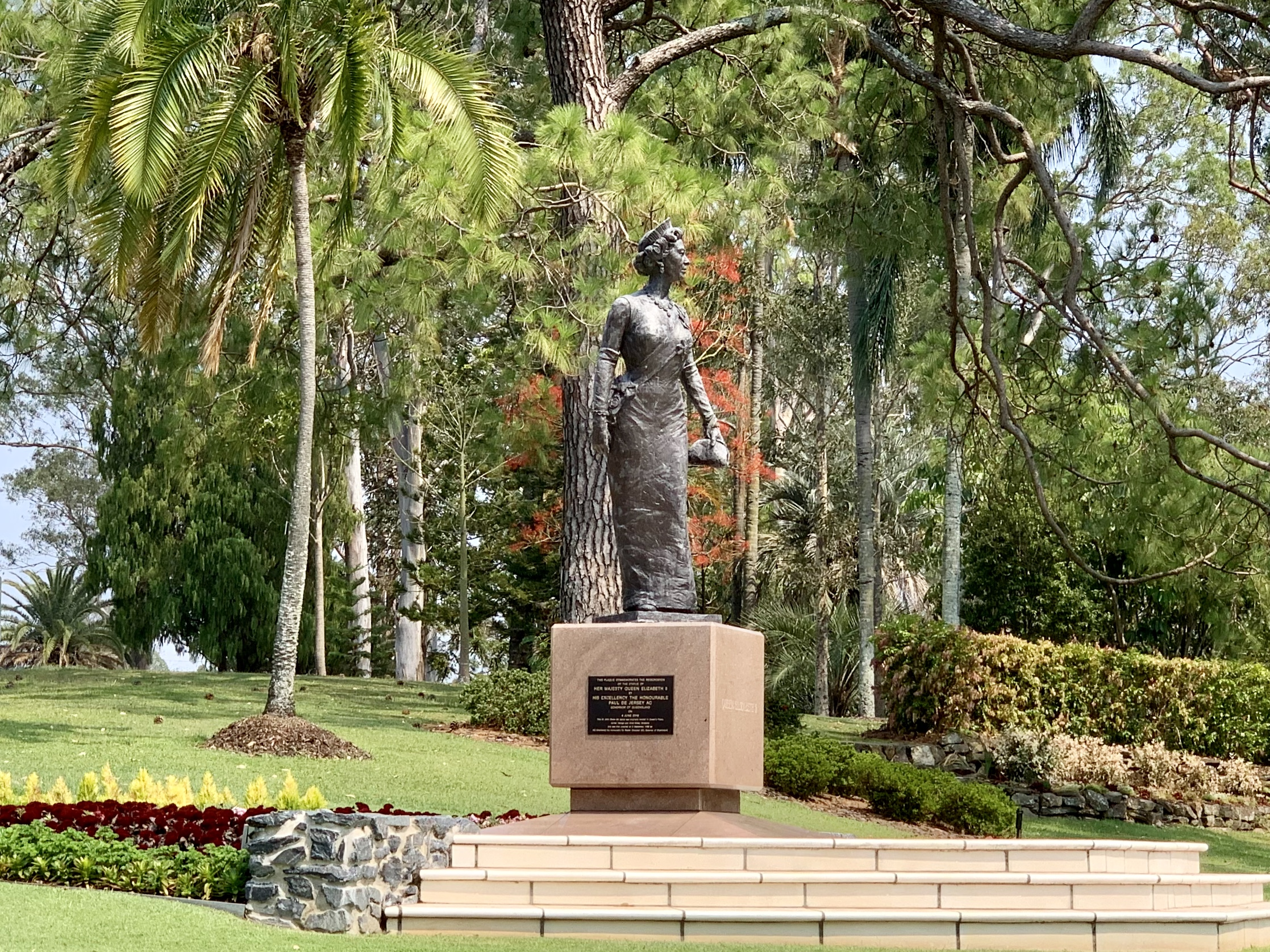
Statue of the Queen at Government House

== See also ==
- Old Government House, Queensland
- Government Houses of Australia
- Government Houses in the Commonwealth
