= Benjamin Backhouse =

Australian architect, builder and politician (1829–1904)

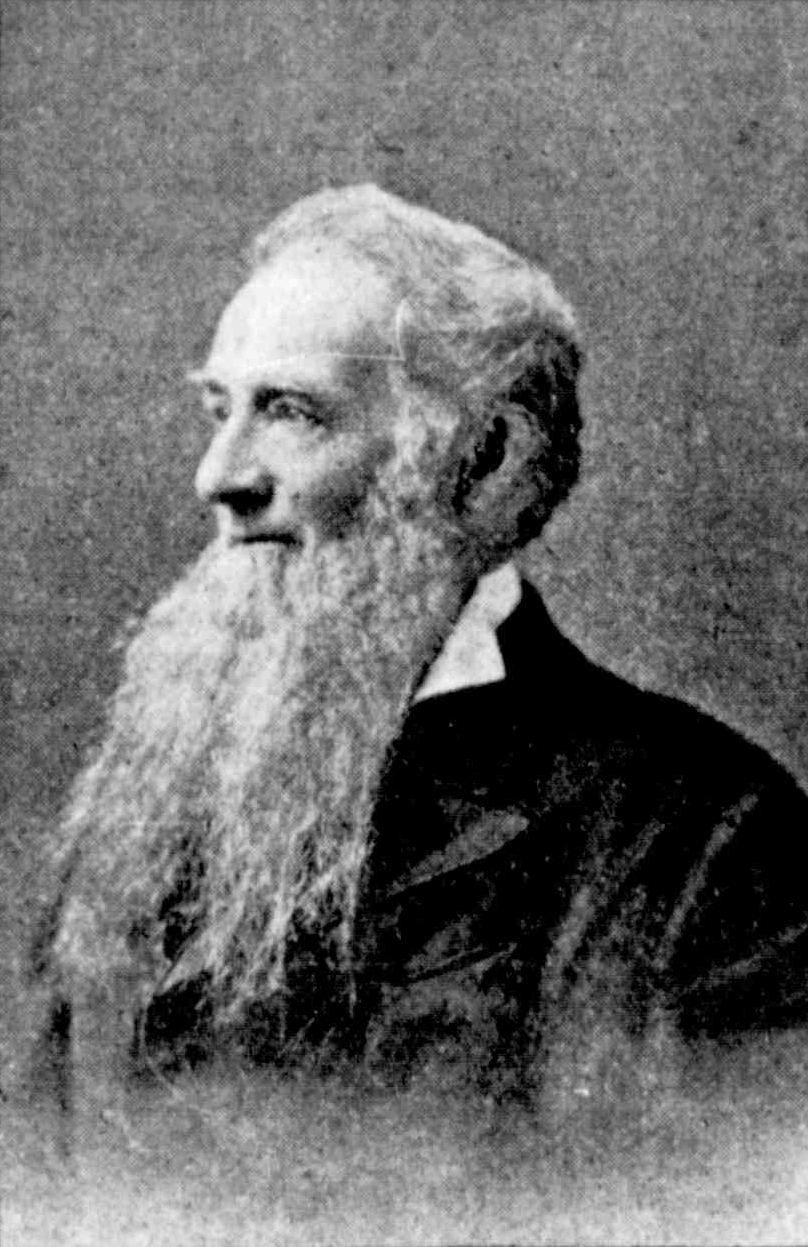

Benjamin Backhouse (1829 – 29 July 1904) was an architect and politician in Australia. He was a Member of the New South Wales Legislative Council.

== Early life ==
Benjamin Backhouse was born in England in 1829. He was a Bachelor of Arts and was educated as an architect.

== Career ==
In early life Backhouse, with his young wife and two children, came out to Australia and settled down in Geelong, Victoria. He soon made a name for himself as an architect, and two months after his arrival succeeded in winning a hundred-guinea prize for the best design for a stock exchange for that city. Some eight years later he returned to England, and remained for a year, and then came out to Queensland. He carried on his profession for eight years, and designed some of the principal buildings in Brisbane. Although he won the design competition for the Queensland Parliament House, it was later decided that his design would be too expensive and was rejected. He was also an alderman of the Brisbane Municipal Council.

In 1868 he moved to Sydney and for the next 35 years Backhouse lived in New South Wales. His professional skill was recognised by his election for 12 years as the chairman of the City of Sydney Improvement Board. In August, 1895, he was appointed to the New South Wales Legislative Council, which he retained until his death. Although not a union official or a Labor candidate, his sympathies were at all times with the workers. He was truly democratic, and was a follower of John Ruskin and other workers for the amelioration of society. He also identified himself with the Pitt Town Settlement, and was chairman of the board of control to look after the affairs of the settlement. Backhouse made several trips to England. On one occasion he had a long conference with William Gladstone and at another time he was honoured by being elected an honorary associate of the Royal Institute of British Architects.

== Later life ==
Benjamin Backhouse died of heart failure at his residence, Ardath, Queen's Avenue, Rushcutters Bay, Sydney, on 29 July 1904.

He was twice married, and left a widow and grown-up family, numbering 11. His sons were District Court Judge Alfred Paxton Backhouse, mining engineer Frank Backhouse, and Ernest, Clarence, Clive, Maurice, and Oscar Backhouse. In deference to his wishes, a private funeral was held.

== Works ==
- Wickham Terrace Church of England, the predecessor of All Saints Anglican Church, Brisbane (1861, no longer extant)
- house Riversleigh, North Quay, Brisbane (1863, no longer extant)
- Cathedral of St Stephen, Brisbane (1863)
- Cintra House, Brisbane (1864)
- Fernberg, Paddington, Brisbane (1864) now Government House, Brisbane
- Old Bishopsbourne, Brisbane (1865)
- Baroona, Paddington, Brisbane (1866)
- Fortitude Valley State School, Brisbane (1867)
- , Sydney (1868)
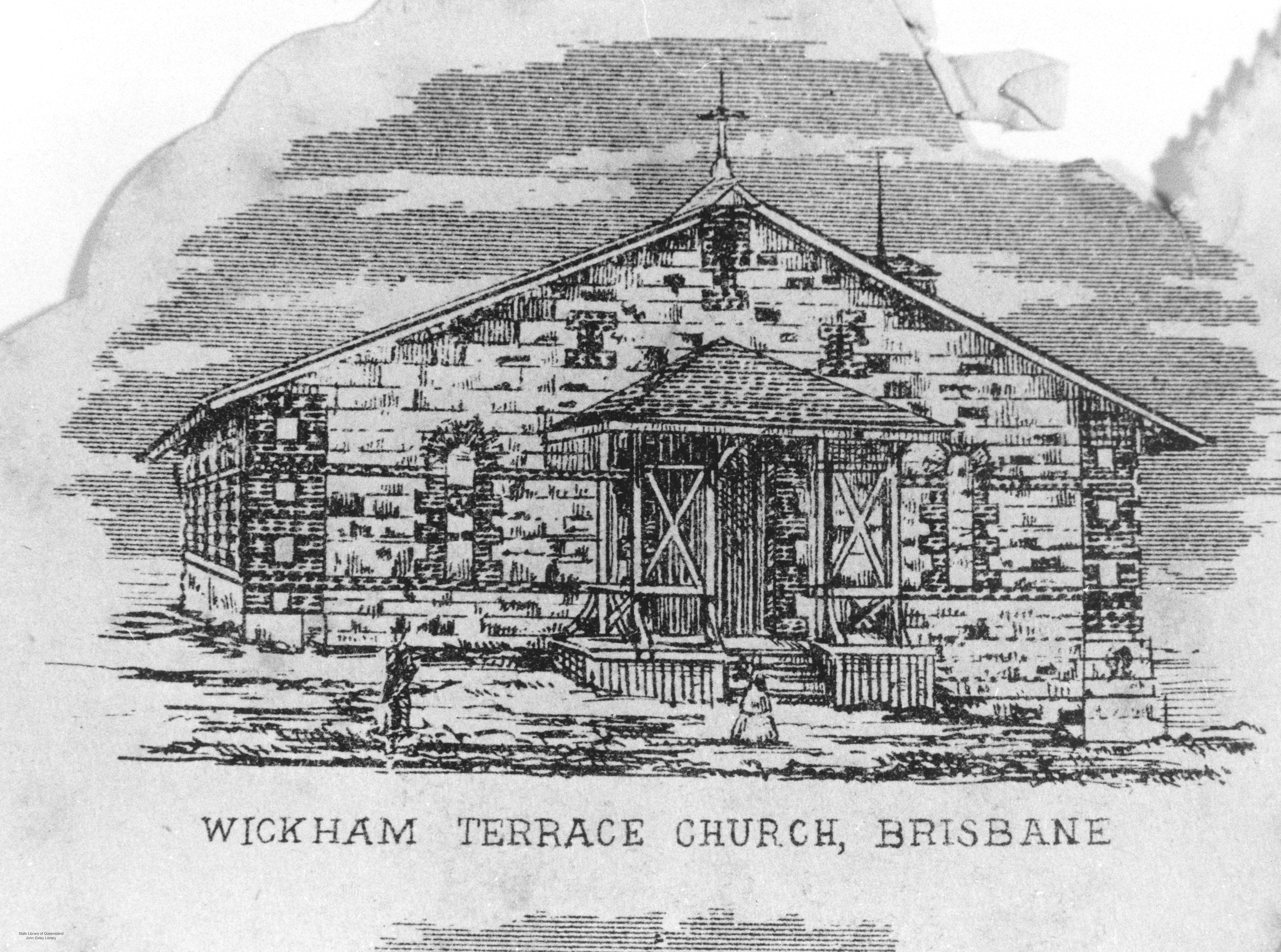
Wickham Terrace Church, circa 1868

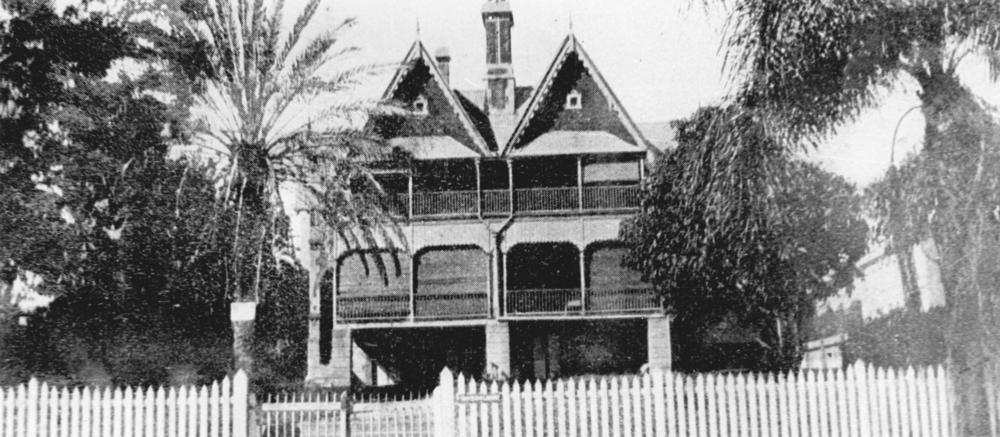
Front view of Riversleigh, North Quay, Brisbane, ca. 1931

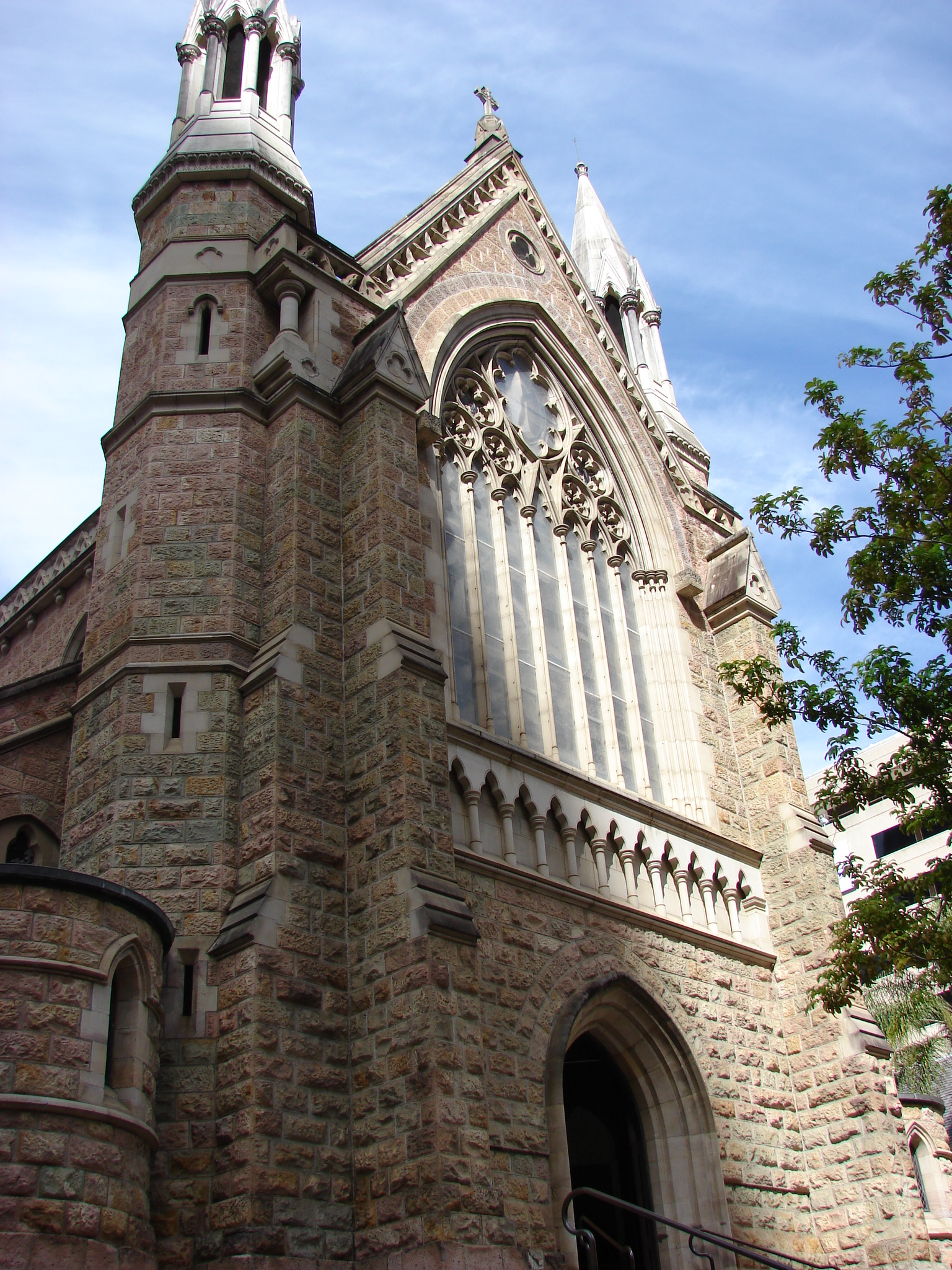
St Stephen's cathedral, Brisbane

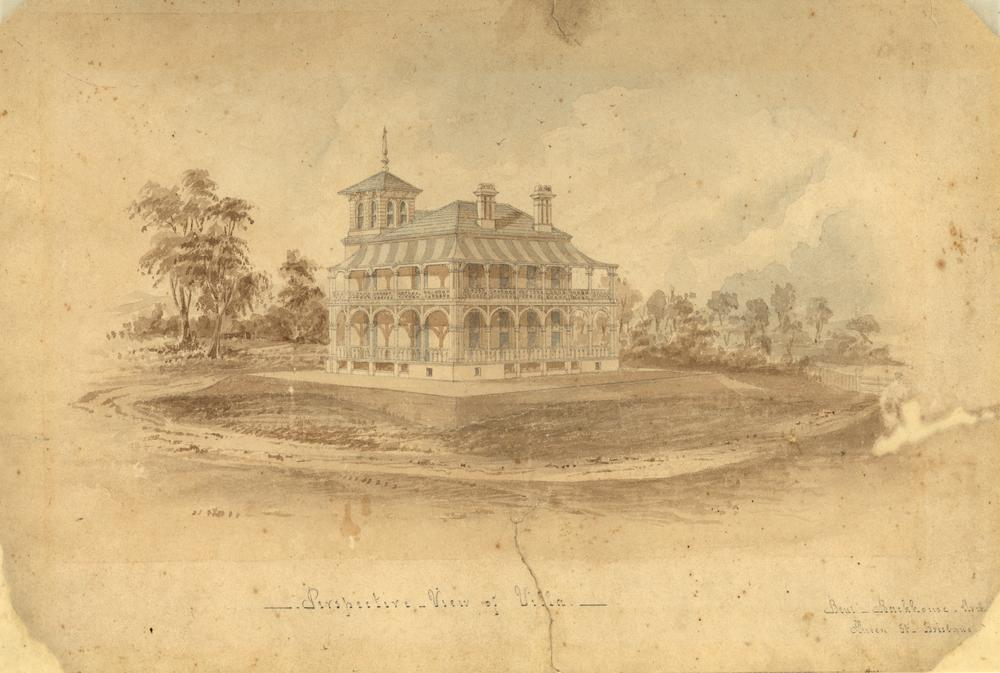
Perspective drawing of Villa Fernberg, Brisbane, ca. 1864
