= Old Bishopsbourne Chapel =

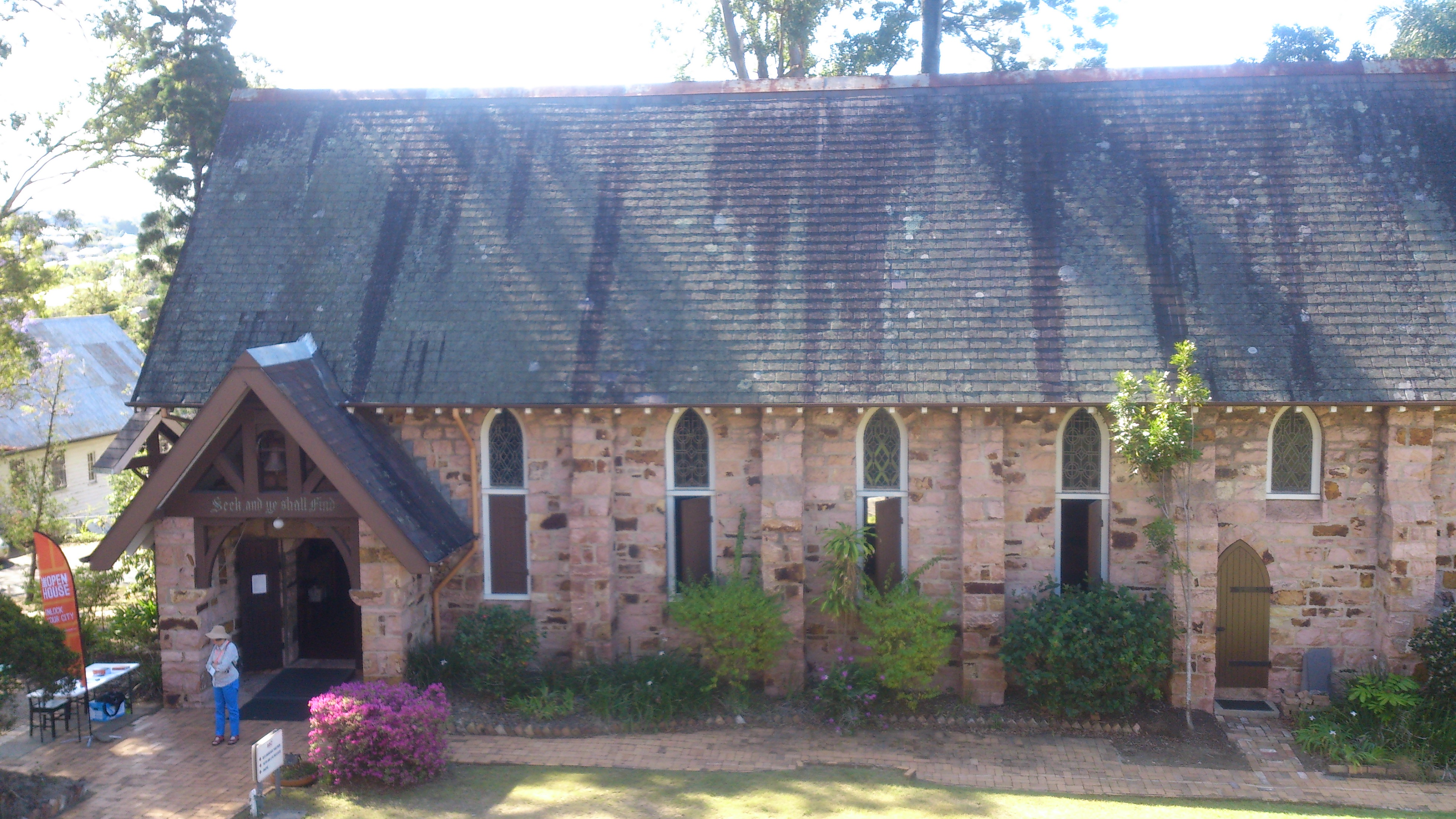
- Old Bishopsbourne Chapel, 2015

- Location within Queensland Location within Australia
- 27.4675°S 153.0033°E
- Location: 233 Milton Road, Milton, City of Brisbane, Queensland, Australia

History
- Design period: 1900–1914 (early 20th century)
- Built: 1912

Site notes
- Architect: Robin Dods
- Architectural style: Gothic

Queensland Heritage Register
- Official name: Old Bishopsbourne Chapel, St Francis' Theological College
- Type: state heritage (built)
- Designated: 21 October 1992
- Reference no.: 600255
- Significant period: 1912 (fabric)
- Significant components: pipe organ
- Builders: Hall & Myers

Old Bishopsbourne Chapel is a heritage-listed Anglican chapel at 233 Milton Road, Milton, City of Brisbane, Queensland, Australia. It was designed by Robin Dods and built in 1912 by Hall & Myers. It is also known as St Francis' Theological College Chapel and Chapel of the Holy Spirit. It was added to the Queensland Heritage Register on 21 October 1992.

== History ==
The stone chapel at Old Bishopsbourne (St Francis' Theological College) was erected in 1912, replacing an earlier timber building of exposed studs designed by diocesan architect Richard George Suter and constructed about 1870.

Archbishop Donaldson, arriving at Bishopsbourne in December 1904, recognised the need to replace the original chapel, which had fallen into disrepair.

In 1912 Donaldson commissioned diocesan architects Hall and Dods to design a chapel which would harmonise with the house and grounds. Robin Smith Dods produced the design, and the chapel was constructed under his supervision by builders Hall and Meyers. It was dedicated in 1912.

Dods practised in Brisbane from 1896 to 1916. With this chapel he displayed a mastery of materials and form, proving that simplicity of construction and design can be as powerful as more elaborate structures.

Since 1936 the chapel has been carefully maintained by generations of St Francis' Theological College students. A loft and restored pipe organ, which were donated from a neighbouring church, were installed at the western end of the chapel in 1971.

While Anglican schools in Queensland generally have a chapel, few would be as old as St Francis', and even fewer would be of local stone.

== Description ==
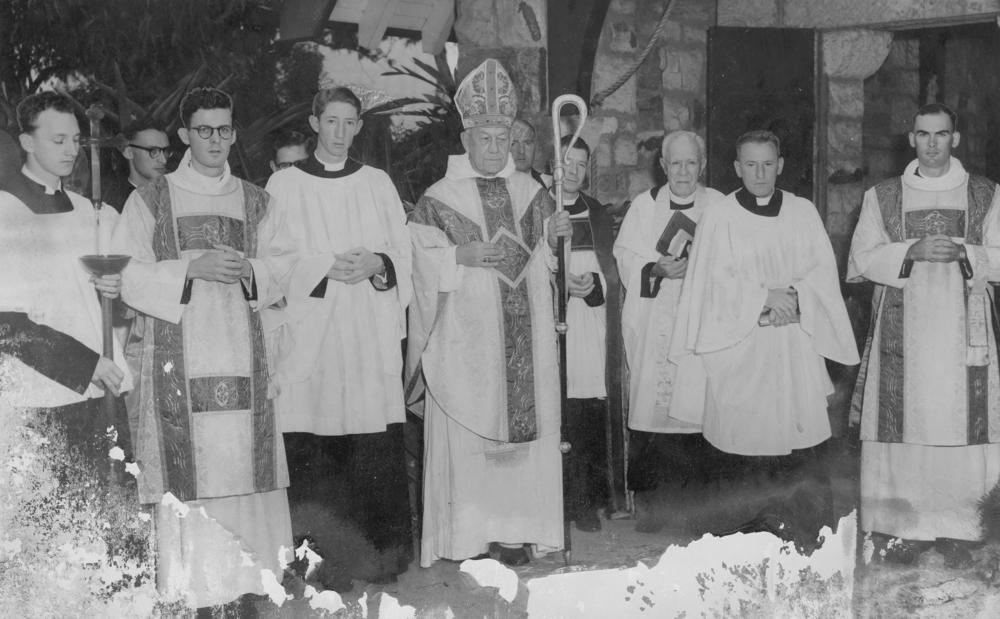
Archbishop Halse with other clergy at the Bishopbourne Chapel, 1954

The chapel is constructed of Brisbane tuff, to a simple rectangular plan 70 by 20 feet (21.3 by 6.1 m). The ambience created is that of a medieval shrine blending with Queensland vernacular and derived stylistic elements of the early 20th century.

Eighteen-inch (460 mm) thick walls with buttresses support a steeply pitched, slate-clad roof. The roof structure of six timber trusses is exposed.

The chapel is lit by long, narrow, Gothic windows in the bays between the buttresses. These windows are unusual in that the lower sections of the openings are unglazed, and are fitted with tongue and groove timber shutters to assist with ventilation and light.

A side porch projects over the entrance, which leads to a small vestry. This is divided from the entrance and interior generally by a timber screen.

The floor is 6 inches (150 mm) above ground level and is covered with red concrete. At the east end the floor originally rose to the sanctuary in the traditional five steps, but the top step has been removed to allow the altar to be detached from the rear wall and to stand free.

The chapel is simply furnished and displays a minimum of adornment. The sanctuary is panelled in silky oak, and decoration of the timber altar is limited to gilded motifs of Australian flora.

The loft at the western end has been installed sympathetically.

== Heritage listing ==
Old Bishopsbourne Chapel was listed on the Queensland Heritage Register on 21 October 1992 having satisfied the following criteria.

The place is important in demonstrating the evolution or pattern of Queensland's history.

Historically it is significant for its close association with the Anglican Archbishops of Brisbane for over 50 years, and with the theological college since 1936.

The place demonstrates rare, uncommon or endangered aspects of Queensland's cultural heritage.

It is important for its rarity of function, fabric and setting in Brisbane, and remains an integral element in the historic Old Bishopsbourne (St Francis Theological College) ecclesiastical grouping.

The place is important in demonstrating the principal characteristics of a particular class of cultural places.

Old Bishopsbourne Chapel, erected in 1912, is significant as a building of outstanding architectural quality, and as a fine example of the ecclesiastical work of Robin S Dods.

The place is important because of its aesthetic significance.

Old Bishopsbourne Chapel, erected in 1912, is significant as a building of outstanding architectural quality, and as a fine example of the ecclesiastical work of Robin S Dods.

The place is important in demonstrating a high degree of creative or technical achievement at a particular period.

Old Bishopsbourne Chapel, erected in 1912, is significant as a building of outstanding architectural quality, and as a fine example of the ecclesiastical work of Robin S Dods.

The place has a special association with the life or work of a particular person, group or organisation of importance in Queensland's history.

Old Bishopsbourne Chapel, erected in 1912, is significant as a building of outstanding architectural quality, and as a fine example of the ecclesiastical work of Robin S Dods.
