= Alfred Paxton Backhouse =

Australian judge (1851–1989)

His Honour Judge Alfred Paxton Backhouse
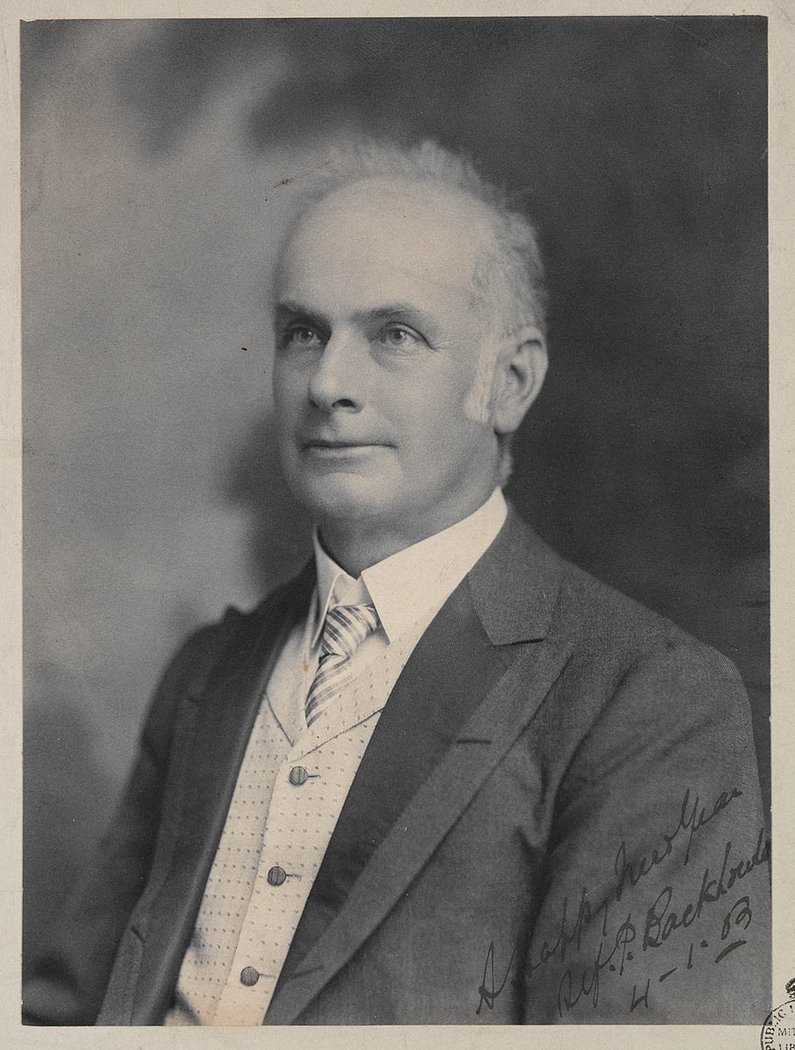
- Backhouse in 1913 (from the Mitchell Library, State Library of New South Wales)

Judge of the District Court of New South Wales
- In office 1884 – 25 May 1921

Personal details
- Born: 25 May 1851 Ipswich, Suffolk
- Died: 1 August 1939 (aged 88) Elizabeth Bay, New South Wales
- Spouse: Kate Marion
- Education: University of Sydney
- Occupation: Judge

Alfred Paxton Backhouse (25 May 1851 – 1 August 1939) was an Australian judge of the District Court of New South Wales, and occasional acting Supreme Court judge. He presided over the trials of the leaders of the 1892 Broken Hill miners' strike, and was an active faculty member of the University of Sydney for over fifty years.

== Early life ==
Backhouse was born in Ipswich, Suffolk in England in May 1851. He was one of seventeen children to Benjamin Backhouse (1829–1904), an architect, and Elizabeth Prentice, née Fuller. His middle name, Paxton, was selected to honour the creator of The Great Exhibition's Crystal Palace – Joseph Paxton – as it was on show during the year of his birth. His parents, who were married on 20 August 1849, were forced by financial constraints to emigrate to Victoria, Australia in 1852 to make their living. The family moved back unsuccessfully to England in 1860 before then relocating first to Brisbane and then to Sydney.

Schooled at Ipswich Grammar School and then the University of Sydney, Backhouse graduated in 1872 with First Class Honours in Classics and First Class Honours in Mathematics and Natural Philosophy, followed by a Master's degree in Arts in 1875. After a brief period of teaching he passed the bar on 16 December 1876. He married on 4 February 1879, to Kate Marion.

== Legal career ==
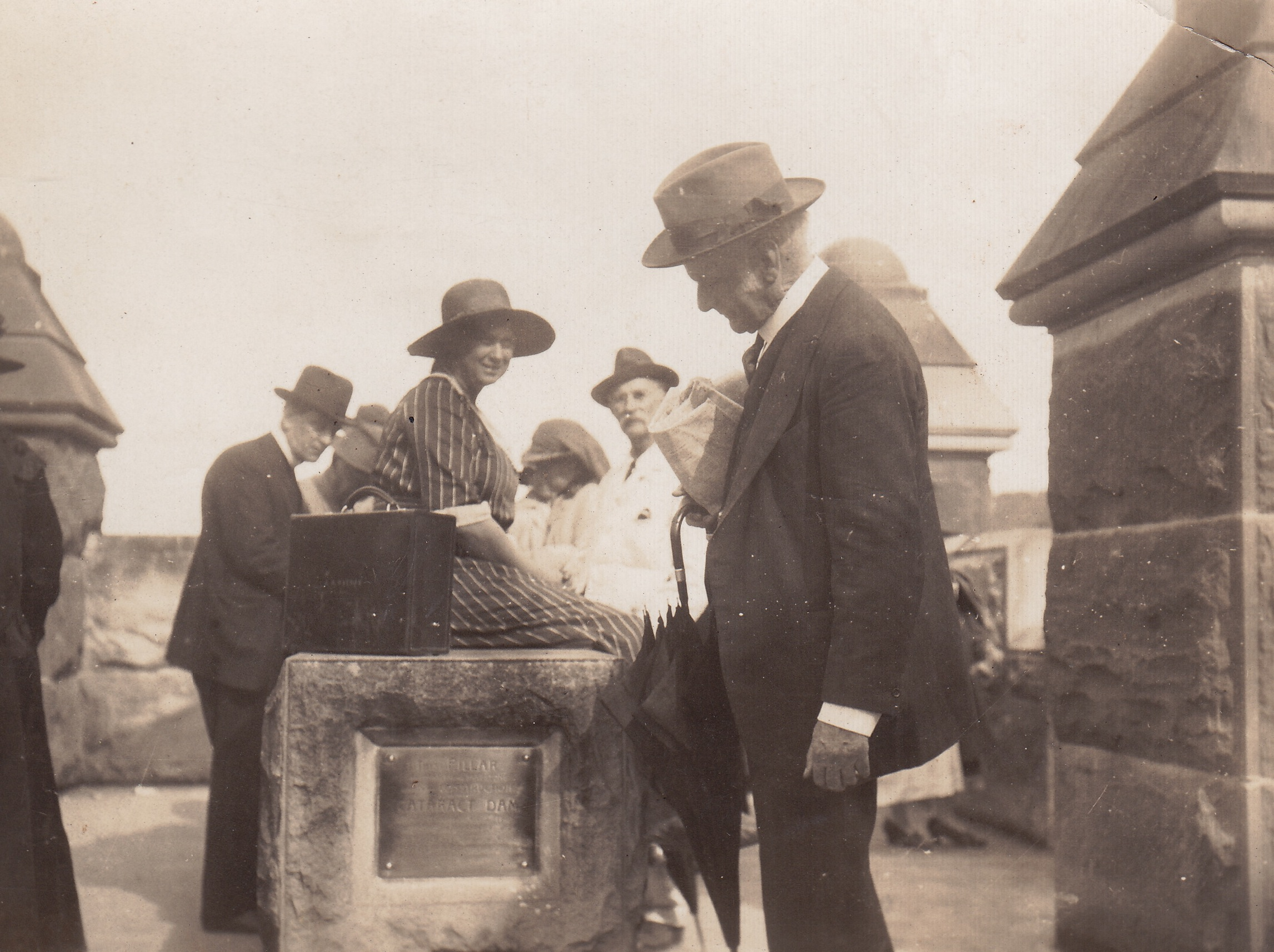
Judge Backhouse (foreground) at Cataract Dam on 22 April 1922

Backhouse became a crown prosecutor in 1878, and a district court judge in 1884. From 1892, the Executive Council appointed Backhouse as an acting Judge of the Supreme Court of New South Wales on several occasions. He presided over the trials of the 7 leaders of the 1892 Broken Hill miners' strike. He was criticised for suspending the sentence of Thomas Rofe, who was convicted of conspiracy in 1895.

He retired from the District Court in May 1921, aged 70 years, as a result of the passage of the Judges Retirement Act 1918 which introduced the retirement age.

Backhouse also served on the Senate of the University of Sydney from 1887 until his death, having been made a lifelong member despite retiring from professional life in 1921. He served as acting chancellor in 1892–94, 1896–99 and 1911–14, and died in Elizabeth Bay in 1939. He had no children. Upon his death, The Sydney Morning Herald proclaimed him one of the "most widely known and best-loved citizens, a distinguished figure in various spheres of life, and a rare personality".
