= Cintra House =

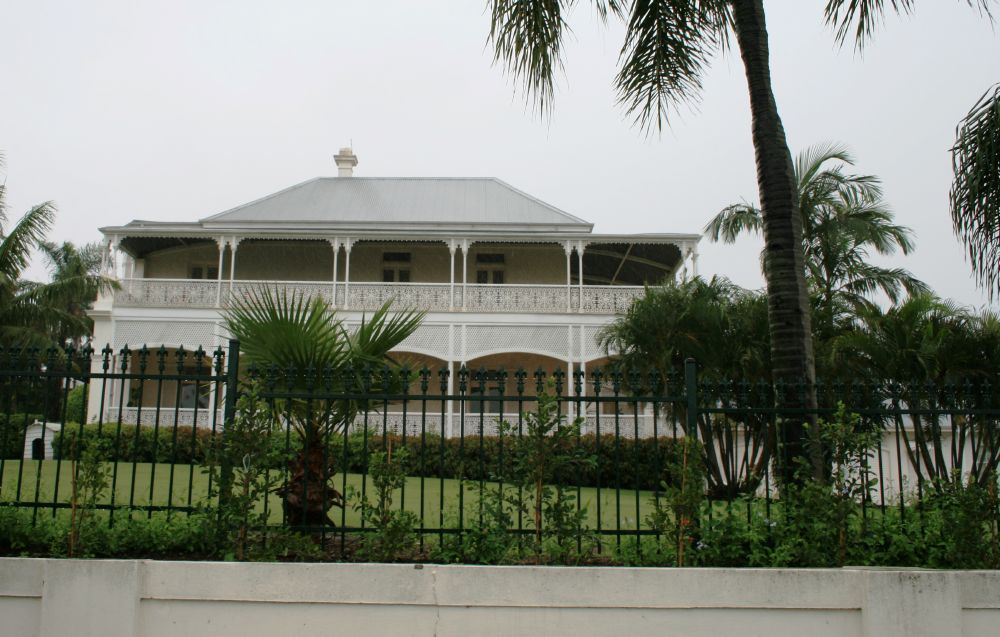
- Modern-day Cintra House

- Location within Queensland Location within Australia
- 27.4466°S 153.0402°E
- Location: 23 Boyd Street, Bowen Hills, Queensland, Australia

History
- Design period: 1840s–1860s (mid-19th century)
- Built: 1863–1890s

Site notes
- Architectural styles: Victorian Filigree, Queenslander

Queensland Heritage Register
- Official name: Cintra House, Cintra
- Type: state heritage (landscape, built)
- Designated: 21 October 1992
- Reference no.: 600054
- Significant period: 1864–
- Significant components: views to, service wing, lawn/s, fence/wall – perimeter, views from, trees/plantings, residential accommodation – main house

Cintra House is a heritage-listed villa at 23 Boyd Street, Bowen Hills, Queensland, Australia. It was built from 1863 to 1890s. It is also known as Cintra. It was added to the Queensland Heritage Register on 21 October 1992.

== History ==
The original Cintra, a two-storeyed Georgian influenced stone house, was built in 1863–64 for George Dudley Webb to a design by Benjamin Backhouse. It comprised four rooms on each level, surrounded by a ground floor verandah.

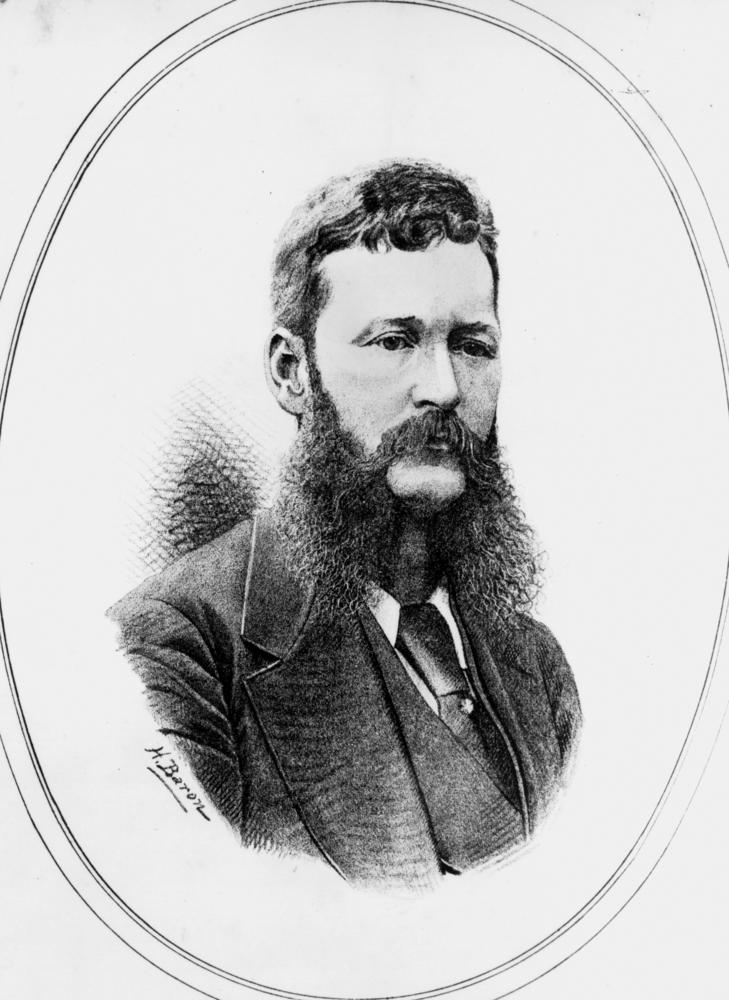
Boyd Dunlop Morehead, 1880

In 1877 the property was bought by Boyd Dunlop Morehead, a successful pastoralist and businessman who was Premier of Queensland 1888–1890. He was also the uncle of P.L. Travers who is best known as the author of the Mary Poppins series of children's books. To accommodate his growing family, Morehead extended the house to the south. This extension now forms a separate residence. A rear service wing is thought to have been built in the 1870s. Possibly about 1890 he added the faceted bay on the eastern side. The old verandah was replaced with two-storeyed verandahs along the northern and western sides.

Morehead died in 1905 and in 1912 Cintra was acquired by railway contractor and businessman Acheson Overend. In 1925 he sold Cintra which was then divided into two, the connection to the southern extension being dismantled. The southern extension eventually, with alterations and additions, became the Cintra Nursing Home.

Cintra House became Our Lady of Victories Convent in 1927. During World War II the American army used the bungalow (but not the main house) as a photographic laboratory. From 1966 to 1973 it was the headquarters of the Queensland Motor Sporting Club. In 1973 it was purchased by Noel Kratzman and refurbished. It then became Cintra House Galleries until 1987 when it returned to its original use as a family home.

== Description ==
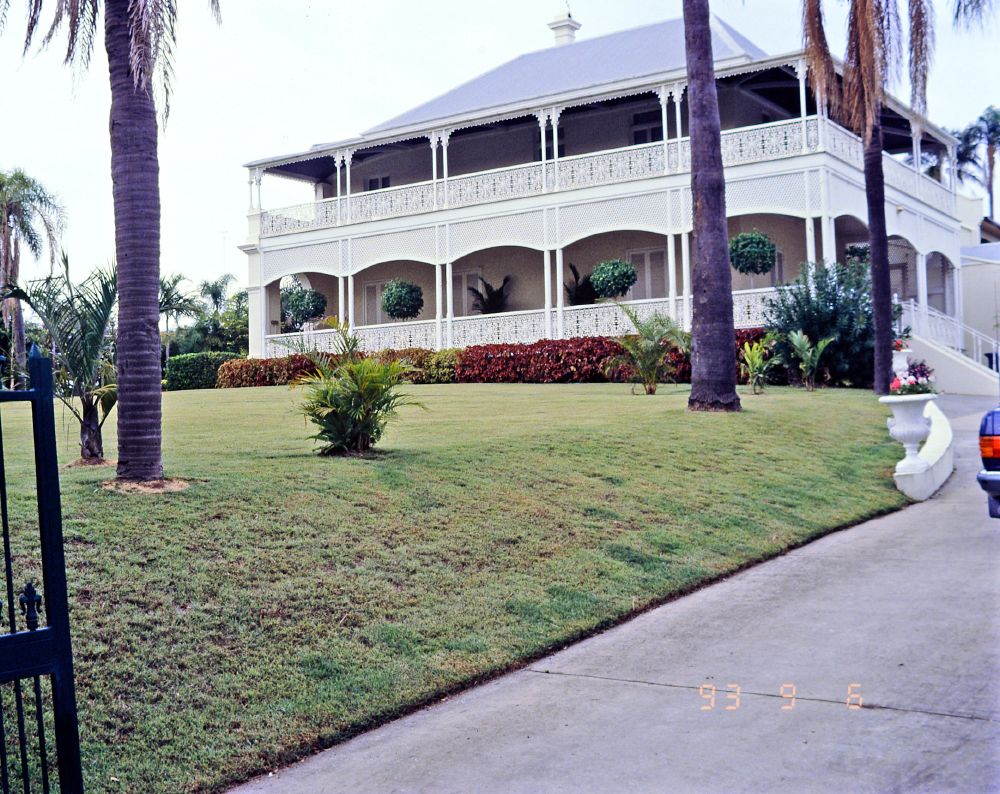
The front lawn of Cintra House in 1993

Cintra House is a two-storeyed masonry house dating from the 1860s, with double-storeyed verandahs on two sides and with a corrugated metal roof. A gabled service wing extends off the rear. The eastern elevation features a double-storeyed faceted bay (possibly 1890). The present two-storeyed verandah running along the northern and western sides, has cast-iron balusters, double posts, and frieze. On the lower level, the latticed valance replaced an earlier scalloped tongue and groove valance at the time of refurbishment. The capitals to the lower level posts were removed at the same time. A small verandah above the entrance porch is of similar design and materials as the main verandah.

Internally the house has been renovated with little of the earlier fabric surviving. It now consists of two reception rooms and a dining room on the ground floor and five bedrooms upstairs. A modern kitchen is located in the service wing.

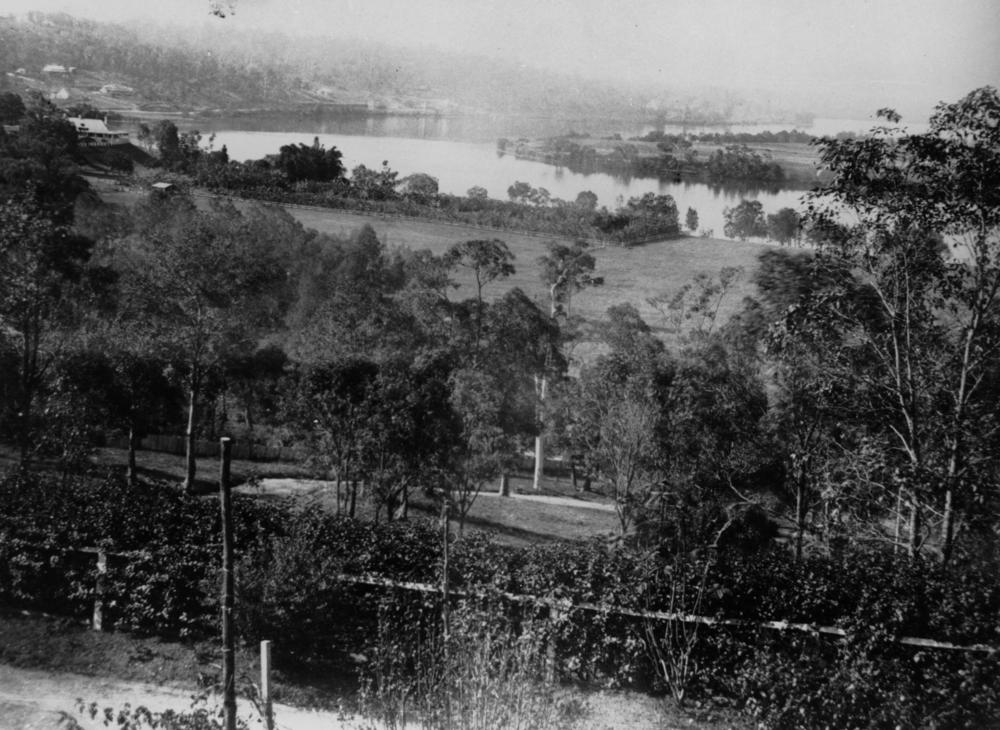
View from Cintra, circa 1875

The house is situated in a prominent hillside position with good views of the Brisbane River. The sweeping north lawn is lined with a row of mature palm trees.

== Heritage listing ==
Cintra House was listed on the Queensland Heritage Register on 21 October 1992 having satisfied the following criteria.

The place is important in demonstrating the evolution or pattern of Queensland's history.

A large "villa" residence which embodies structural and stylistic changes from the 1860s, reflecting changing affluent lifestyle and tastes.

The place is important because of its aesthetic significance.

Its landmark quality as one of Brisbane's most commanding hilltop residences.

The place has a special association with the life or work of a particular person, group or organisation of importance in Queensland's history.

Its association with Boyd Morehead.
