= Coorparoo =

- Suburb
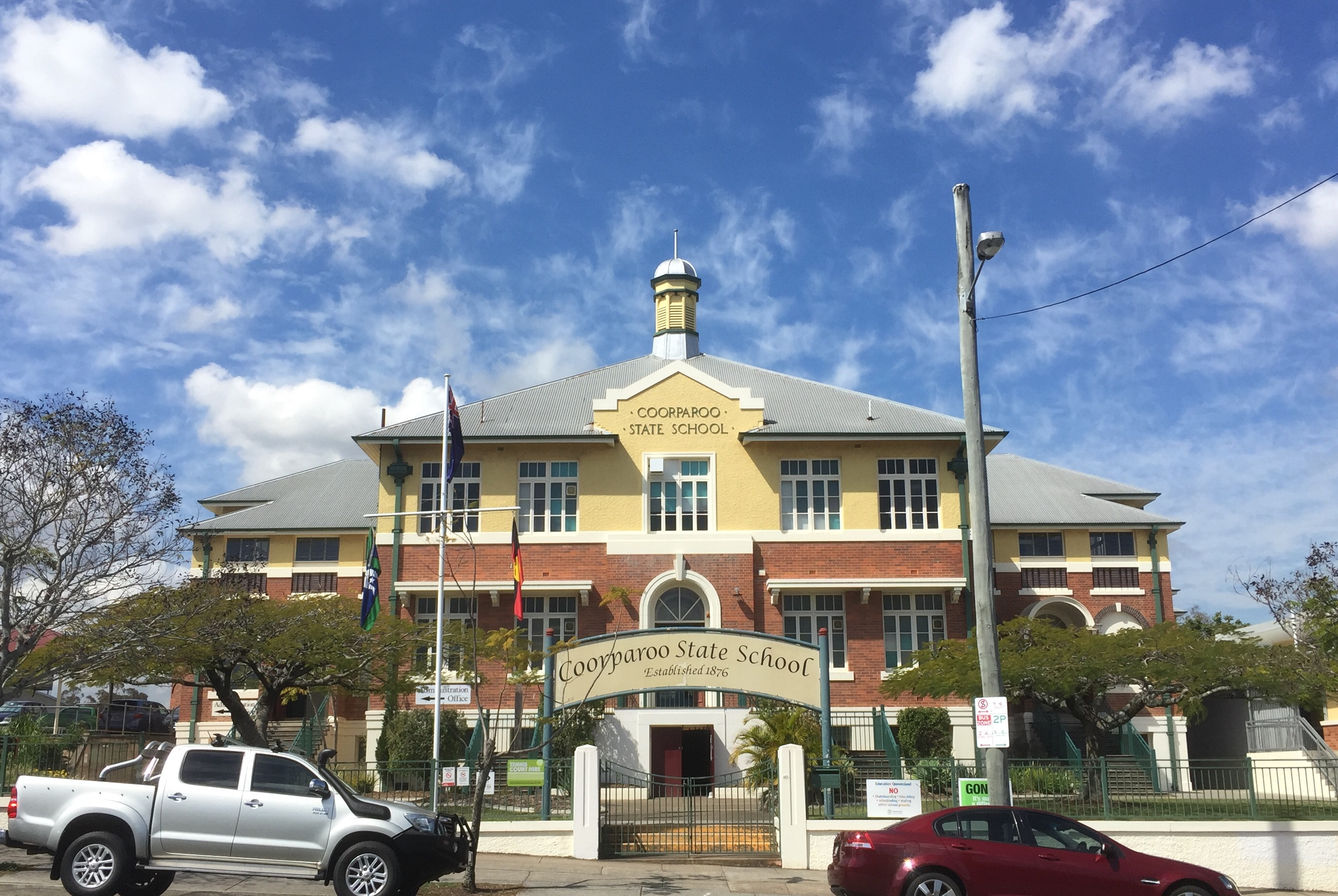
- Coorparoo State School

- Interactive map of Coorparoo
- Coordinates: 27.5008°S 153.0591°E
- Country: Australia
- State: Queensland
- City: Brisbane
- LGA: City of Brisbane (Coorparoo Ward)
- Location: 5.7 km (3.5 mi) SE of Brisbane CBD

Government
  - State electorate: Greenslopes
  - Federal division: Griffith

Area
  - Total: 5.4 km^{2} (2.1 sq mi)

Population
  - Total: 18,132 (SAL 2021)
- Time zone: UTC+10:00 (AEST)
- Postcode: 4151
Suburbs around Coorparoo
East Brisbane	Norman Park	Norman Park
Woolloongabba; Stones Corner	Coorparoo	Camp Hill
Greenslopes	Holland Park	Camp Hill

Coorparoo (/ˌkuːpəˈruː/ KOO-pə-ROO) is a suburb in inner Brisbane, Queensland, Australia. In the 2021 census, Coorparoo had a population of 18,132 people.

== Geography ==
Coorparoo is 5.7 kilometres (3.5 mi) by road south-east of the Brisbane GPO. It borders Camp Hill, Holland Park, Stones Corner, Greenslopes, East Brisbane and Norman Park.

== Toponymy ==
Coorparoo was chosen as the name of the suburb at a public meeting on 22 March 1875, before which it was known as Four Mile Camp. The name Coorparoo is likely derived from an Aboriginal name for Norman Creek, probably recorded by early surveyors as Koolpuroom. The word is thought to refer to either a place associated with mosquitoes, or a sound made by the 'gentle dove'. The latter explanation appears doubtful though, as 'gentle dove' may mean the spotted dove, which was introduced to the area in 1912, long after the name Coorparoo was adopted.

== History ==
=== Aboriginal history ===
The Coorparoo clan, an Aboriginal clan, lived south of the Brisbane River and generally camped along creeks. Their name comes from Kulpurum, which was the word for Norman Creek or a tributary of it. They continued to occupy watercourse campsites after white settlement, but other clans from the region began to move into South Brisbane.

In 1846, there were reports of Aboriginal people raiding produce along Norman Creek. In 1853, there was a fight between Ningy Ningy, Bribie Island (Djindubari), Amity Point, and Logan peoples at Norman Creek. A visitor in 1855 reported many camps and fishing spots between Stones Corner and the mouth of Norman Creek. In 1959, an eighty-year-old woman told of frequent corroborees on the banks of the creek in Norman Park. Corroborees were also held at a little creek that crossed Norfolk Street.

=== Urban development ===
On 17 June 1856, ten farms were sold from the Parish of Bulimba near Stones Corner. Investors bought all but two of them. The next year James Warner surveyed land on the other side of the road for a second land auction.

Samuel Stevens donated two acres of his property near the junction of Cavendish and Old Cleveland Roads for use of a school. He declined the offer of naming the area "Steven's Town".

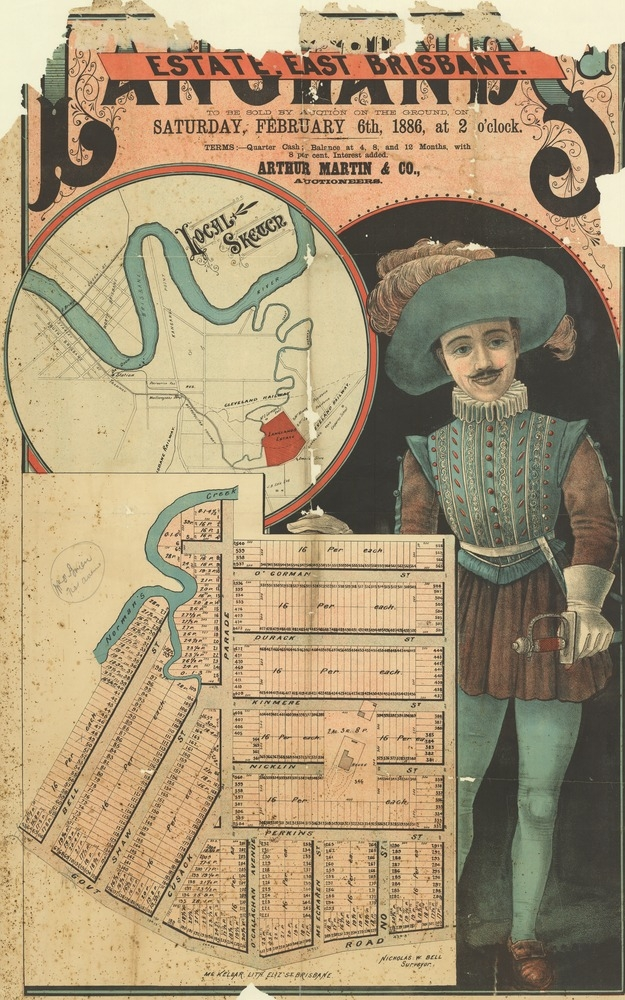
Real estate map of Langlands Estate East, Coorparoo, 1886

In 1876, the Coorparoo State School was opened and Frederick Robinson began offering public transport in a wagonette from Coorparoo Junction to Victoria Bridge. The 1880s land boom was a spur to profit from land. John Black was the first to subdivide land in the area in 1882 and later a variety of subdivisions were offered to the public. The construction of the bridge at Stanley Street (1886) and the development of the Stanley Bridge Estate made the area more attractive to purchasers. In 1887, the tramway was extended to Buranda, putting the western end of Coorparoo close to tram travel.

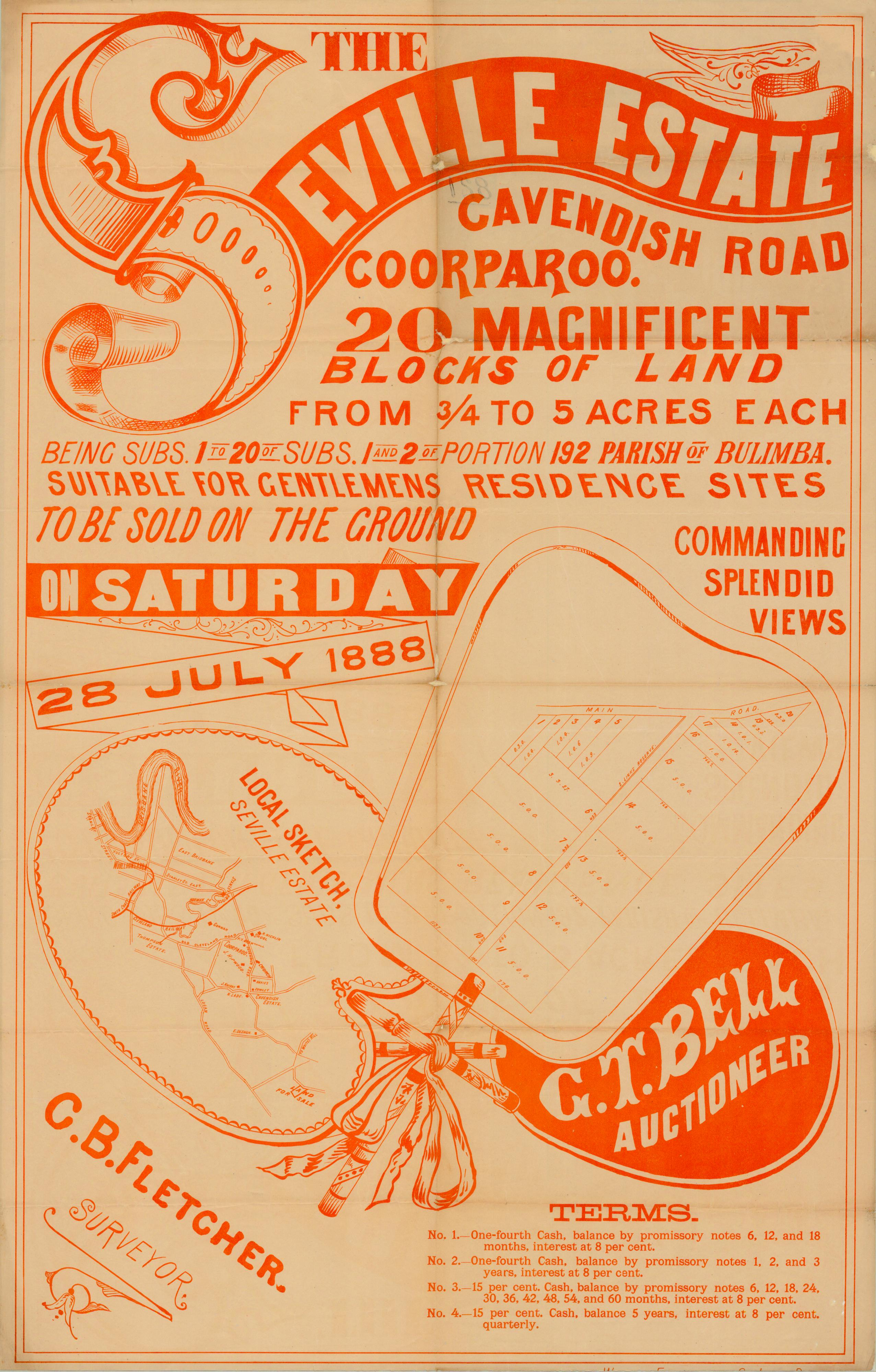
Estate map of the Seville Estate, Cavendish Road, Coorparoo, Brisbane, Queensland, 1888.

On Saturday 9 August 1884, auctioneers Simon Fraser & Son offered for sale 222 suburban allotments ranging from 32 to 48 perches (810 to 1,210 m^{2}) in the "Wecker Estate", the property of Frederick Wecker. Although the auction was well attended, only 21 allotments were sold on the day.

In February 1886, the "Langlands Estate, East Brisbane" was advertised to be auctioned by Arthur Martin & Co. The advertisement describes 568 allotments commencing a few yards beyond the junction of the Cleveland and Logan Roads, with extensive frontage to the Cleveland Road. A map advertising the auction shows the Nicklin residence on the estate.

Coorparoo had been part of the Bulimba Divisional Board since 1879. However, in 1888, as a result of dissatisfaction with this situation, a petition was taken resulting in the creation of Shire of Coorparoo. A bridge was built at Burnetts Swamp (Stones Corner) and important road improvements took place. Development was taking off. In 1889, there were 2,500 people in the shire.

Coorparoo Wesleyan Methodist Church opened on Sunday 13 June 1886. The current church building opened on 18 April 1959, with the former church being disassembled to provide material for a new church at Carina. With the amalgamation of the Methodist Church into the Uniting Church of Australia in 1977, it became the Coorparoo Uniting Church. Recently it has joined with the Norman Park Uniting Church under the new name of Faith Works Uniting Community.

On 22 December 1888, "St Leonard's Estate" was advertised for auction by R. J. Cottell. A map advertising the auction shows the estate as adjoining the "Langlands Estate" and close to the Coorparoo railway station. A newspaper advertisement of the day notes that "St Leonard's Estate" can be reached "in a very few weeks by the train".

In May 1889, on what is now known as Carina, 275 subdivided allotments of "Stanley Street Extended Estate" were advertised to be auctioned by James R. Dickson & Company. A map advertising the auction mentions 'free waggonettes from the Mart'.

On 7 November 1891, auctioneers T. Howling & Co offered for sale 27 suburban lots in the "Wendouree Estate" bounded by Old Cleveland Road to the north and Wecker Street (now Kirkland Avenue) to the east. It is unclear if any blocks were sold at the time as on 6 February 1913 Roman Catholic Archbishop James Duhig purchased this same land as a 3-acre (1.2 ha) site and it is now occupied by St James' Catholic Church and School.

The floods of 1889 and 1893 hit the low-lying areas of Coorparoo. The flooding combined with the 1890s depression slowed development in the area. In 1900, there were actually fewer houses than there had been ten years earlier. The settlement was dense from Stones Corner to Kirkland Avenue (originally named Wecker Street but it was changed in 1914 in the wake of anti-German sentiment), but further out it was mainly bush with a few isolated farms and houses. The only major industry was the brickworks of Abraham James at St Leonards Street, which employed eighty men in the 1880s.

A Baptist church opened in Coorparoo on Sunday 17 July 1910.

After World War I, land prices increased as property sales boomed. Coorparoo did not really begin to expand again until the tram service was extended to Stones Corner in 1902 and Coorparoo Junction in 1915. The number of houses increased from 613 in 1911 to 1,467 ten years later.

"The Gem of Coorparoo" estate was advertised for auction by Cameron Bros in March 1922. A map of the estate shows 51 allotments in the area near the convent, now Villanova College, including St Leonard's Street, Lackey Avenue, Fourth, Fifth, Sixth, Seventh and Eighth Avenues, Edmond Street and Diamond Avenue (now Barnes Avenue). The map also shows the Coorparoo railway station and the tramline on Old Cleveland Road.

Presbyterian services in Coorparoo commenced with Sunday school and Sunday evening services held in the Shire Hall on Cavendish Road, organised as an outreach of St John's Presbyterian Church in Annerley. Land in Emlyn Street was purchased for £550 and a hall erected at a cost of £1500, opening in July 1928. In September 1931, Coorparoo Presbyterian Church engaged its first minister Reverend Andrew Cuthbertson Kennedy.

During World War II, the Catholic United Serviceman's Association bought the house Erica at 398 Cavendish Road to establish a convalescent home for returned servicemen. The house was on a 6-acre (2.4 ha) block bounded by Cavendish Road, Goring Street, Beresford Terrace, Strangman Terrace, and Park Street. In 1946, the Xavier Society (a charity operated by Catholic professional and businessmen) purchased the property to establish the Xavier Home for Crippled Children (most of whom were victims of polio). Initially ten children were accommodated in the house until further buildings could be constructed on the site. On Sunday 15 May 1949, Archbishop James Duhig laid the foundation stone for a new hospital wing, announcing that children of all faiths could be admitted to the facility. The hospital was operated by the Sisters of Perpetual Adoration until the Franciscan Missionaries of Mary took over in 1951. The facilities on the site continued to expand over the years and also catered for children with intellectual disabilities and terminal illnesses. By the 1990s, caring for children in institutions was being phased out in favour of providing support for children in their own homes with the Xavier Home officially closing in 1994 with its last in-patient discharged on 27 October 1995. On 16 February 1996 the staff moved to a new location at 284 Pine Mountain Road, Mount Gravatt East, which was better suited to providing support services. In 2004, the house Erica was listed on the Brisbane Heritage Register. In 2007, the site was purchased to create The Village, a retirement community, resulting in the demolition of the hospital buildings with the house Erica being refurbished as a communal facility for the residents.

St Anne's Anglican Church opened circa 1958 in the Upper Cavendish Road area. It closed circa 1980s.

Coorparoo State High School opened on 1 January 1963. It was renamed Coorparoo Secondary College on 1 January 1994.

On 24 August 1970, the Queensland Government established the Xavier Special School at 39 Beresford Terrace with two teachers in two rooms of the Xavier Home for Crippled Children (27.5066°S 153.0649°E) to provide special education to the children in the facility. Following the closure of the Xavier Home in 1994, Xavier Special School continued to operate from the Beresford Terrace site. In 2002, the Xavier School formally merged with Camp Hill State High School and Whites Hill State School (both in Camp Hill) to form Whites Hill State College (also in Camp Hill) with Xavier Special School becoming the Xavier Special Education Unit within the college. Despite the merger, the Xavier Special Education Unit continued to operate from the Beresford Terrace site until 2009 when the lease expired on that site. In 2010, it was relocated to Mount Gravatt West Special School (now Nursery Road Special School in Holland Park West), despite a petition signed by 588 people in December 2008 wanting the Xavier Special Education Unit to be relocated to Whites Hill State College (noting there was plenty of space available on that campus). One of the reasons given for choosing Mount Gravatt West Special School was the superior facilities it offered to incorporate Xavier's conductive education methods for children with multiple impairments, such as the hydrotherapy centre. As at 2022, Xavier's conductive education is provided in purpose-built classrooms at Nursery Road Special School.

Metropolitan Districts Netball Association was established in 1974 at Downey Park in Windsor, relocating to Wembley Park in Coorparoo in 1976. Its Coorparoo facilities were flooded in the 2011 Brisbane floods.

In 2009, the Myer Department store building was compulsorily resumed for Eastern Busway and bus station by the Queensland Government. The Coorparoo station was going to be built on the Myer building site. In 2015, the old Myer Department store building on the corner of Old Cleveland Road and Cavendish Road was demolished. In its place are 3 residential towers with commercial development on the lower floors. The development, known as Coorparoo Square opened in 2017 and features a 10 screen Dendy cinema, Aldi Supermarket and speciality retailers and coffee shops. The Coorparoo bus station was not built. Under the development, will be a void for the future Eastern Busway station.

In 2011, Brisbane School of Distance Education relocated to Coorparoo from its former site in West End. The school is the amalgamation of the Primary Correspondence School (opened on 24 January 1922), the Secondary Correspondence School (opened in 1958) and the Preschool Correspondence (opened in 1974).

== Demographics ==
Population over time
Census	Population	Notes
2001 census	13,243	
2006 census	13,800	
2011 census	14,944	
2016 census	16,282	
2021 census	18,132	

In the 2016 census, Coorparoo had a population of 16,282 people, of whom 51.2% were female and 48.8% were male. The median age of the population was 34; 4 years younger than the Australian average. Aboriginal and/or Torres Strait Islander people made up 0.9% of the population. 70.7% of people living in Coorparoo were born in Australia, with the next most common countries of birth being India (3.6%), New Zealand (3%), England (2.5%), Nepal (0.9%), and China (0.7%). 77.6% of people only spoke English at home, while the other most common responses were Spanish (1.2%), Hindi (1.2%), Punjabi (1.1%), Mandarin (1%), and Greek (1%). The most common responses for religion were No Religion 29.8%, Catholic 28.6% and Anglican 11.2%.

== Heritage listings ==
Coorparoo has a number of heritage-listed sites, including:

- 67 Cavendish Road: Coorparoo railway station
- 143 Cavendish Road: Brethren Meeting Room (also known as Gospel Hall)
- 174 Cavendish Road: Interwar Shop (also known as Faust's Grocery)
- 203 Cavendish Road: Mairita
- 208 Cavendish Road: Coorparoo School of Arts and RSL Memorial Hall (also known as Coorparoo Shire Hall)
- 217 Cavendish Road: Coorparoo Gospel Chapel
- 219 Cavendish Road: former Coorparoo Fire Station
- 227 Cavendish Road: Miegunyah
- 236 Cavendish Road: Glenena
- 312 Cavendish Road: Memorial Church of Our Lady of Mount Carmel
- 328 Cavendish Road: Romaeden (also known as Ridgeland), built in the 1880s for the Blundell family
- 342 Cavendish Road: Verona
- 343 Cavendish Road: former St Stephen's Church of England & Hall
- 398 Cavendish Road: former Erica (also known as Xavier Hospital)
- 427 Cavendish Road: Loreto College
- 475 Cavendish Road: Anzac Cottage (also known as TB Home)
- 189 Chatsworth Road: Camoola
- 257 Chatsworth Road: King's Residence
- 2 Dowar Street: Ellensvale (also known as Ellesvale)
- 6 Dowar Street: Davaar
- 41 Gladstone Street: Menlough
- 41 Kirkland Avenue: Air Raid Shelter
- 44 Lade Street: Wynyard (also known as Belgaum House)
- 12 Letchworth Road: Coorparoo Presbyterian War Memorial Church and Hall
- 7 Mackay Street: Garnet Hill
- 19 Mackay Street: Balblair
- 12 Main Avenue: Coorparoo Substation No. 210
- 165 Old Cleveland Road: St James Catholic Church & Presbytery
- 245 Chatsworth Road (27.5049°S 153.0647°E): former Tram Shelter
- 307 Old Cleveland Road (27.4947°S 153.0593°E): former Tram Stop
- 312 Old Cleveland Road: Sullivan's Building
- 327–335 Old Cleveland Road: Coorparoo State School
- 347 Old Cleveland Road: Queen Alexandra Home (also known as Hatherton and Alexandra House)
- 30 Rialto Street: Hinda
- 32 Riddings Street: Coorparoo Bowls Club
- 75 Shakespeare Street: Linwood
- 34 Sixth Avenue: Villanova College (also known as Langlands, Good Samaritan Convent of Saint Scholastica)
- 36 Smeaton Street: Mon Abri
- 1222 Stanley Street East: Neilson's Cottage
- 149 Temple Street: Mecklenburg's Cottage
- 401 Upper cornwall Street: Thrushton
- 437 Upper cornwall Street: Bayard Residence
- 65 Wylie Avenue: Tarrangower
- 9 York Street: Coorparoo Uniting Church & Hall (also known as Coorparoo Methodist Church and Hall)

== Education ==
Coorparoo State School is a government primary (Prep–6) school for boys and girls at 327 Old Cleveland Road (27.4940°S 153.0605°E). In 2018, the school had an enrolment of 824 students with 57 teachers (49 full-time equivalent) and 22 non-teaching staff (15 full-time equivalent). It includes a special education program.

St James Primary School is a Catholic primary (Prep–6) school for boys and girls at 92 Kirkland Avenue (27.4995°S 153.0524°E). In 2018, the school had an enrolment of 140 students with 15 teachers (10 full-time equivalent) and 7 non-teaching staff (5 full-time equivalent).

Our Lady of Mount Carmel School is a Catholic primary (Prep–6) school for boys and girls at Norfolk Street (27.5027°S 153.0626°E). In 2018, the school had an enrolment of 576 students with 40 teachers (32 full-time equivalent) and 22 non-teaching staff (13 full-time equivalent).

Brisbane School of Distance Education is a government primary and secondary (Early Childhood to Year 12) school for boys and girls on the corner of Stanley Street and Cavendish Road (27.4865°S 153.0538°E). In 2018, the school had an enrolment of 3,467 students with 260 teachers (237 full-time equivalent) and 83 non-teaching staff (68 full-time equivalent). It includes a special education program.

Villanova College is a Catholic primary and secondary (5–12) school for boys at 24 Sixth Avenue (27.4960°S 153.0510°E). In 2018, the school had an enrolment of 1230 students with 98 teachers (96 full-time equivalent) and 63 non-teaching staff (50 full-time equivalent).

Coorparoo Secondary College (formerly known as Coorparoo State High School) is a government secondary (7–12) school for boys and girls on the corner Stanley Street East and Cavendish Road (27.4863°S 153.0537°E). In 2018, the school had an enrolment of 409 students with 49 teachers (44 full-time equivalent) and 23 non-teaching staff (18 full-time equivalent). It includes a special education program. It includes the Coorparoo Centre for Continuing Secondary Education.

Loreto College Coorparoo is a Catholic secondary (7–12) school for girls at 415 Cavendish Road (27.5099°S 153.0639°E). In 2018, the school had an enrolment of 833 students with 72 teachers (68 full-time equivalent) and 43 non-teaching staff (36 full-time equivalent).

Queensland Pathways State College is a government secondary (10–12) school for boys and girls at 327 Old Cleveland Road (27.4940°S 153.0612°E). In 2018, the school had an enrolment of 198 students with 26 teachers (24 full-time equivalent) and 18 non-teaching staff (17 full-time equivalent).

== Amenities ==
Brisbane City Council provides 30 parks in Coorparoo. They range in size from large to small and have a range of different facilities.

Despite the name, Coorparoo Cricket Club has its clubhouse at 18 Crown Street, Norman Park. Home games are played at Peter Burge Oval.

Coorparoo is home of the Eastern Suburbs District Rugby League Football Club who play their home games at Langlands Park. Langlands Park regularly hosts training sessions for the Queensland and Australian Rugby League teams when they are playing in Brisbane.

The Brisbane Lions train during the week at Giffin Park, also in Coorparoo.

The Metropolitan Districts Netball Association are based at Wembley Park, on the corner of Burke Street and Robinson Street (27.4893°S 153.0620°E). They have 12 netball courts.

Faith Works Uniting Community is at 260 Cavendish Road (corner York Street, 27.4991°S 153.0624°E).

== Attractions ==
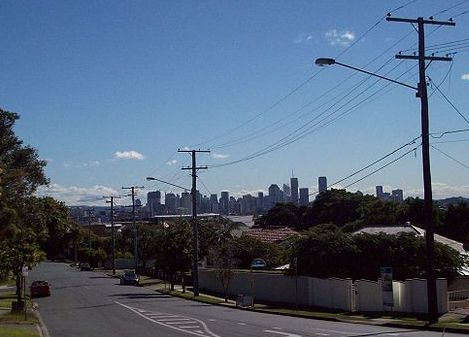
Brisbane Central Business District viewed from Upper Cornwall Street, Coorparoo.

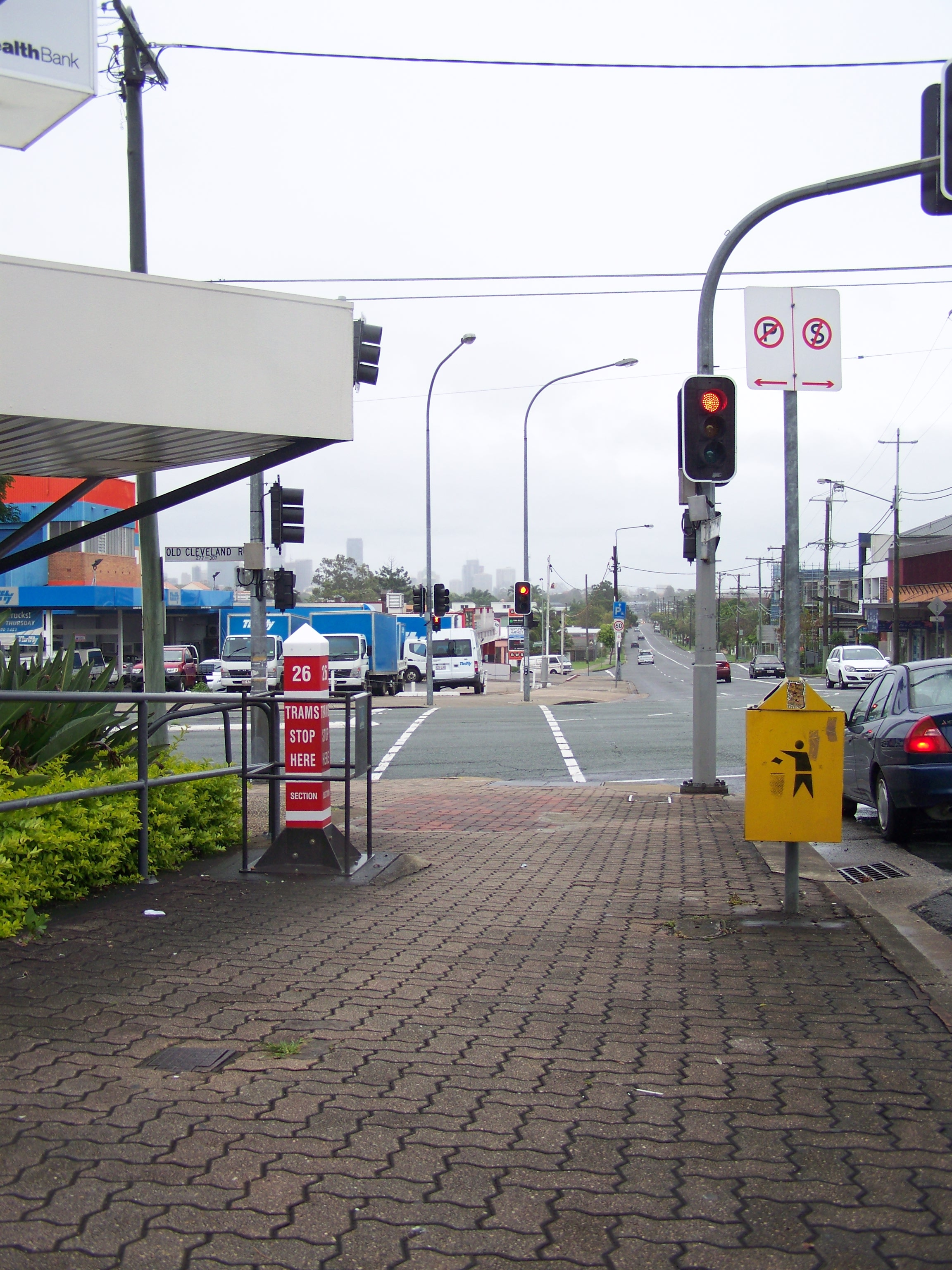
Tram Post

Coorparoo has a range of distinctive homes, buildings, and sites of interest, including:

- Spanish Mission Revival homes along Cavendish Road. This was a popular inter-war house style introduced from California
- Ridgelands (1880s), built for the Blundell family
- Cardington (1880s) at the corner of Norfolk Street and Cavendish Road. This residence was built by Thomas Howling who had purchased the allotments from early settler George Harden.
- Barston Place (1880) on Norfolk Street, built for Scottish born James Burstall and named after his birthplace.
- Coorparoo Shire Hall (1892) at the corner of Cavendish Road and Halstead Street. The building is now owned by the Coorparoo School of Arts and Memorial Hall Association Inc. and is known as The School of Arts Hall.
- Restored Tram Post at the corner of Old Cleveland and Cavendish Roads.
- Hatherton (1886). This elite residence was built for Reuben Nicklin whose previous residence was called Langlands. Reuben and his wife Jane were drowned in the RMS Quetta disaster in 1890. The house has subsequently been extensively renovated and changed and is now known as the heritage-listed "Queen Alexandra Home" having been used as a Methodist Home for children, teaching classrooms for the local TAFE College and more recently as a community centre.
- Chatsworth (1888), built for William Evans who worked at Stewarts of Stones Corner. Chatsworth Road is named after this residence.
- Langlands (1883), built for Reuben Nicklin. This building is in the grounds of the present Villanova College and is the oldest surviving masonry residence in Coorparoo.
- Kirkland Avenue. A tree-lined street with views of the Brisbane CBD. This avenue was lined with larger Queenslander houses until the late 1960s when the Brisbane City Council allowed their demolition for blocks of units. Some of these units have been demolished and replaced with more modern blocks of units.
