= Coorparoo School of Arts and RSL Memorial Hall =

Heritage-listed school in City of Brisbane

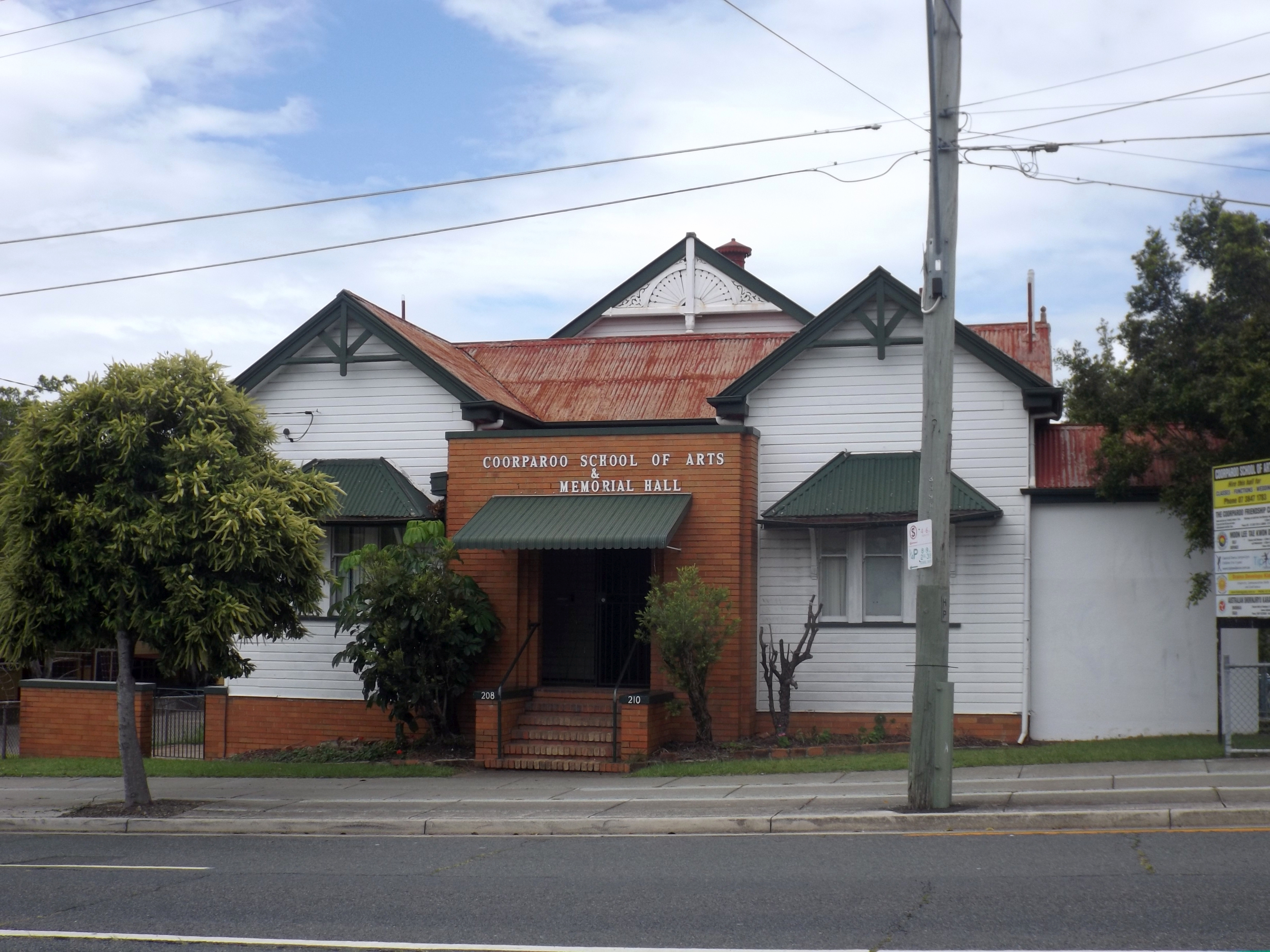
- View from Cavendish Road, 2015

- Location within Queensland Location within Australia
- 27.4957°S 153.0603°E
- Location: 208 Cavendish Road, Coorparoo, City of Brisbane, Queensland, Australia

History
- Design period: 1870s–1890s (late 19th century)
- Built: 1892–1953
- Built for: Coorparoo Shire Council

Queensland Heritage Register
- Official name: Coorparoo School of Arts and RSL Memorial Hall, Coorparoo School of Arts, Coorparoo Shire Hall
- Type: state heritage (built)
- Designated: 6 January 1999
- Reference no.: 602054
- Significant period: 1892–1925 (historical council); 1920s (historical school of arts); 1890s–1950s (fabric); 1890s ongoing
- Significant components: war service memorial: honour board (roll of honour), hall, objects (movable) – communications

Coorparoo School of Arts and RSL Memorial Hall is a heritage-listed school of arts at 208 Cavendish Road, Coorparoo, City of Brisbane, Queensland, Australia. It was built from 1892 to 1953. It is also known as Coorparoo School of Arts and Coorparoo Shire Hall. It was added to the Queensland Heritage Register on 6 January 1999.

== History ==
The Coorparoo School of Arts and RSL Memorial Hall was constructed in 1892 for the Council of the Shire of Coorparoo. The Council remained in the building until October 1925, when amalgamation of local governments occurred and Greater City of Brisbane was created. Since 1925, it has been used as a School of Arts.

The Divisional Boards Act 1879 established 74 local authorities in Queensland with Coorparoo administered as Subdivision 3 of the Bulimba Divisional Board. Primary concerns of the board included the maintenance and improvement of roads and bridges, the Bulimba ferry and water supply to river villages. In 1888 Coorparoo was represented on the Bulimba Divisional Board by Frederick Thomas Brentnall, Frederick Wecker and John Douglas. These men, along with other Coorparoo residents, claimed that more could be accomplished for the locality. They resigned from the Board and led demands for the creation of the Coorparoo Shire. The Shire of Coorparoo was proclaimed on 27 October 1888.

By 1892 the Councillors decided that a Shire Hall was a necessity. Two allotments on the corner of Cavendish Road and Council (now Halstead) streets were purchased. Henry Wallace Atkinson, a local architect, designed the Hall and it was built by a Mr Allibone at a cost of £514, plus £78 for architect's fees and £14 for seating. The Council moved in on 7 October 1892.

Constructed with gas fittings for six lamps, the Hall was the first gas lit building in the Shire, further, the first telephone in the district was installed on 1 November 1892. The Hall was hired out as a social club and played an important role in the social life of the district. The Roll of Honour was unveiled by James Stodart, Member of the Queensland Legislative Assembly for Logan on 24 June 1916. The honour board is dedicated to the men and women of the District who served in the World War I.

With the amalgamation of local government authorities and the establishment of Greater City of Brisbane in 1925, a new use was sought for the shire hall. Local residents organised to form a School of Arts committee and, in 1928, the Trustees of the School of Arts contracted to pay the Council of the City of Brisbane £1000.

In 1930 the Trustees accepted the offer of the Avondale Lodge to build a side verandah on the north-west elevation. The Trustees paid £200 for the fabric. The new wing was officially opened by Trustee and politician Reginald King, the Member of the Queensland Legislative Assembly for Logan on 19 July 1930. In 1938, the stage was removed providing more space in the Hall and a small stage was constructed at the rear.

In 1946, the Brisbane City Council began asking for payment of £750 which was owing on the purchase price of the hall, the alternative was to hand in the Hall's keys. Revenue was raised through a variety of activities, including renting the hall to the Coorparoo Kindergarten, and by 1948 the fund stood at over £550. It was also at this time that the Coorparoo Returned Services League (RSL) suggested that they take over the Hall and its debts. Solicitor King drew up a new constitution for the two groups and in April 1956, the Minister of Public Lands and Crown Law Office approved the amalgamation and constitution. The Hall was subsequently renamed the Coorparoo School of Arts and RSL Memorial Hall.

The brick and stucco additions as the front of the Hall were initially rejected at a meeting of the School of Arts committee in December 1951, however, by July 1953, the Trustees' honorary architect, Eric Percival Trewern, had drawn up plans and specifications and called for tenders. Builder AA Lock's tender for £777 was accepted.

Coorparoo School of Arts and RSL Memorial Hall continues to be used extensively by the community.

== Description ==
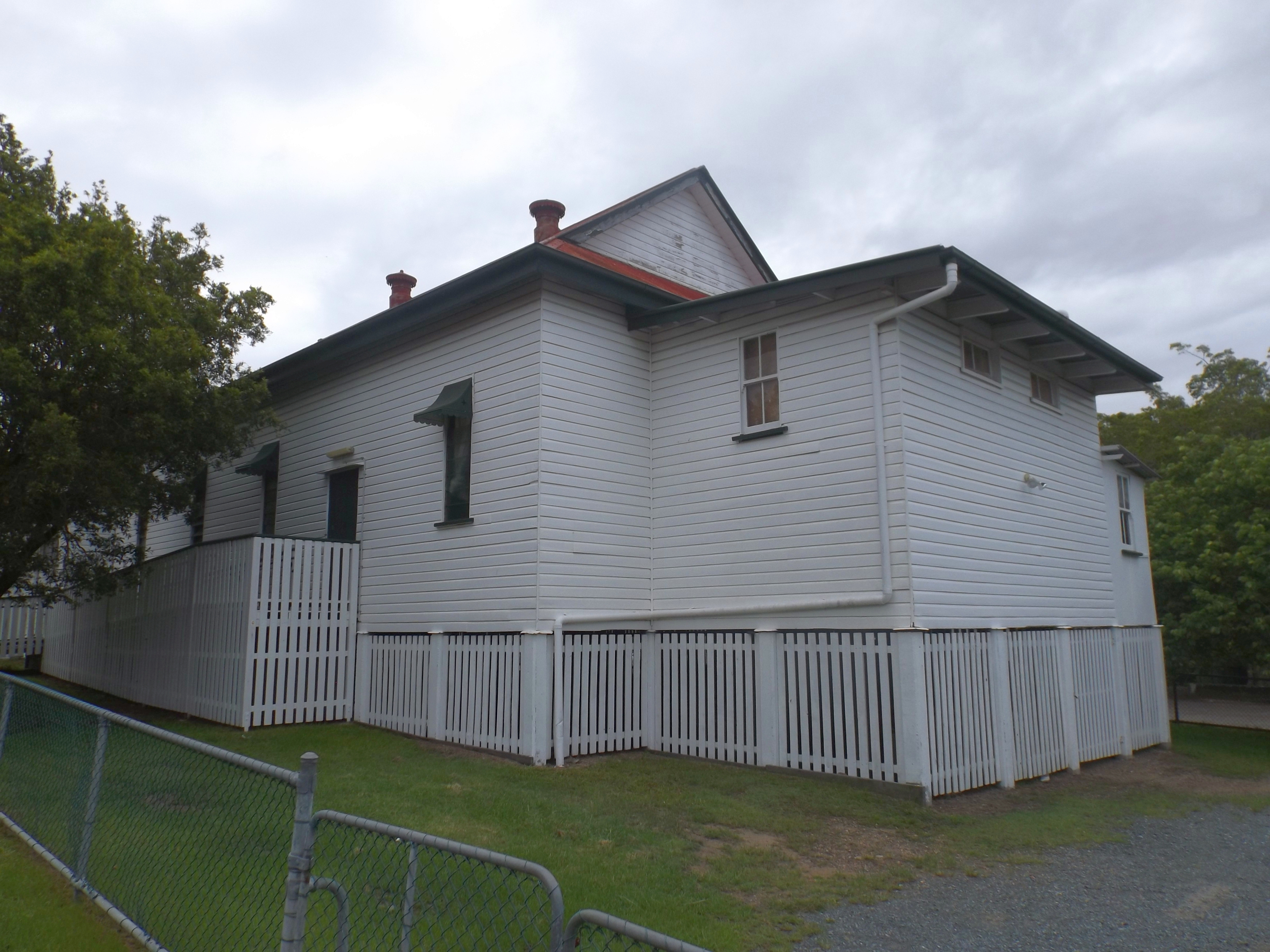
Rear of the building, 2015

The Coorparoo School of Arts and RSL Memorial Hall is a single storey timber building, with concrete stumps and a corrugated iron roof, located on the corner of Cavendish Road and Halstead Street, Coorparoo.

The form of the 1892 Hall is still intact with the main hall to the rear of the building and administration rooms to the front. Later additions and extensions include the building of the verandah in the 1930s, extensions to the eastern, or rear facade in 1938, the brick addition to the front façade in the 1950s and the strong room extension to the southern façade.

The Cavendish Road, or western elevation, is symmetrical with projecting porches under separate gabled roofs. Double hung sash windows with window hoods are located along the elevation. Decorative timber brackets form part of the window hoods. The 1950s brick extension is centrally located between the two projecting porches. At the top of the brick facade an inscription reads "Coorparoo School of Arts & R.S.L. Memorial Hall". A doorway and two windows are located at the northern end of the western façade. The doorway provides the entrance to the kitchen which forms part of the 1930s verandah extension.

The masonry strong room is located at the corner of the western and southern elevations. The timber remainder of the southern elevation has narrow windows along the length of the elevation and a doorway located at the eastern end of the building. Located along the roof are two ridge ventilators.

The rear of the Hall, the eastern elevation, is in two sections. The extensions are in timber with a separate corrugated iron roof. The larger section, now housing the stage, has two windows located high in the façade. The second, smaller section, houses a dressing room and has a window located along the eastern elevation.

The northern elevation comprises a verandah, built during the 1930s. A set of stairs leading to the verandah is located in the eastern end of the elevation. Louvred windows are located along most of the façade with a set of three windows at the western end.

Further along the western end of the northern elevation, which forms part of the front section of the Hall, are two windows located beneath a gable with a decorative timber bargeboard. One comprises a set of two windows with a window hood, and a second set of three double hung sash windows, also with a window hood. The window hood which covers the set of three windows includes decorative timber brackets.

Internally, the front foyer opens to two rooms on the northern and southern sides. A vent with decorative fretwork is located in the room at its southern end. The strong room is accessed from this room.

Paired timber doors with a breezeway open to a small hall. The timber within the doors' framework has been angled to create a decorative effect. The Hall's street numbers 208 and 210, are located on small oval metal plates on the architrave. Female and male toilets are located to the northern and southern ends of the Hall. The toilets, installed in the 1950s, have terrazzo floors and skylights.

Paired, panelled timber doors, with a breezeway, lead to the main hall. The main hall has a timber floor and the raised stage is located at the eastern end of the room. The stage is accessed via a set of timber stairs. Timber vents with decorative fretwork are located along the length of the ceiling. The central section of the timber ceiling is flat and the sides and ends are angled. Two doors, leading to the verandah, are located in the northern elevation. Three narrow windows are located along the northern elevation.

Also located along the northern elevation is the Coorparoo Roll of Honour and the first telephone in the district. The Honour Board is a copper board mounted on a timber base. Names are applied on individual brass strips. The Board displays ornament relief such as scrolls, flowers and cannons. The wooden telephone is framed within a timber box with glass front.

The verandah, or northern elevation houses kitchen facilities at the western end and a small storage area, with a doorway to another smaller room, is located at the eastern end. From the storage area some evidence of window infill is located. The window still exists but has been boarded up at some stage.

The property is surrounded by a low wire fence and a car park is situated at the rear of the building. A picket fence is located at the base of the building at the corner of the western and northern elevations.

== Heritage listing ==
Coorparoo School of Arts and RSL Memorial Hall was listed on the Queensland Heritage Register on 6 January 1999 having satisfied the following criteria.

The place is important in demonstrating the evolution or pattern of Queensland's history.

The Coorparoo School of Arts and RSL Memorial Hall is significant as it demonstrates the development of the institution of local government in Coorparoo.

The Coorparoo School of Arts and RSL Memorial Hall is significant as the first gas lit building in the Shire and also housed the first telephone in the district.

The place is important in demonstrating the principal characteristics of a particular class of cultural places.

In its relatively unchanged state, the Coorparoo School of Arts and RSL Memorial Hall demonstrates the principal characteristics of a late nineteenth century local shire hall.

The place is important because of its aesthetic significance.

Located at the corner of Cavendish Road and Halstead Street, the Coorparoo School of Arts and RSL Memorial Hall is important for its aesthetic significance and its contribution to the streetscape.

The place has a strong or special association with a particular community or cultural group for social, cultural or spiritual reasons.

The Hall has a special association with the people of Coorparoo and continues to be a focal point for social and community functions.

The place has a special association with the life or work of a particular person, group or organisation of importance in Queensland's history.

The Coorparoo School of Arts and RSL Memorial Hall is significant for its association with architect Henry Wallace Atkinson, who designed the building in 1892.

== See also ==
- History of Brisbane, the city of which Coorparoo is now a part
- Local government in Queensland
- Returned and Services League of Australia (The RSL)
