= Old Cleveland Road =

Road in Brisbane, Australia

Old Cleveland Road Queensland
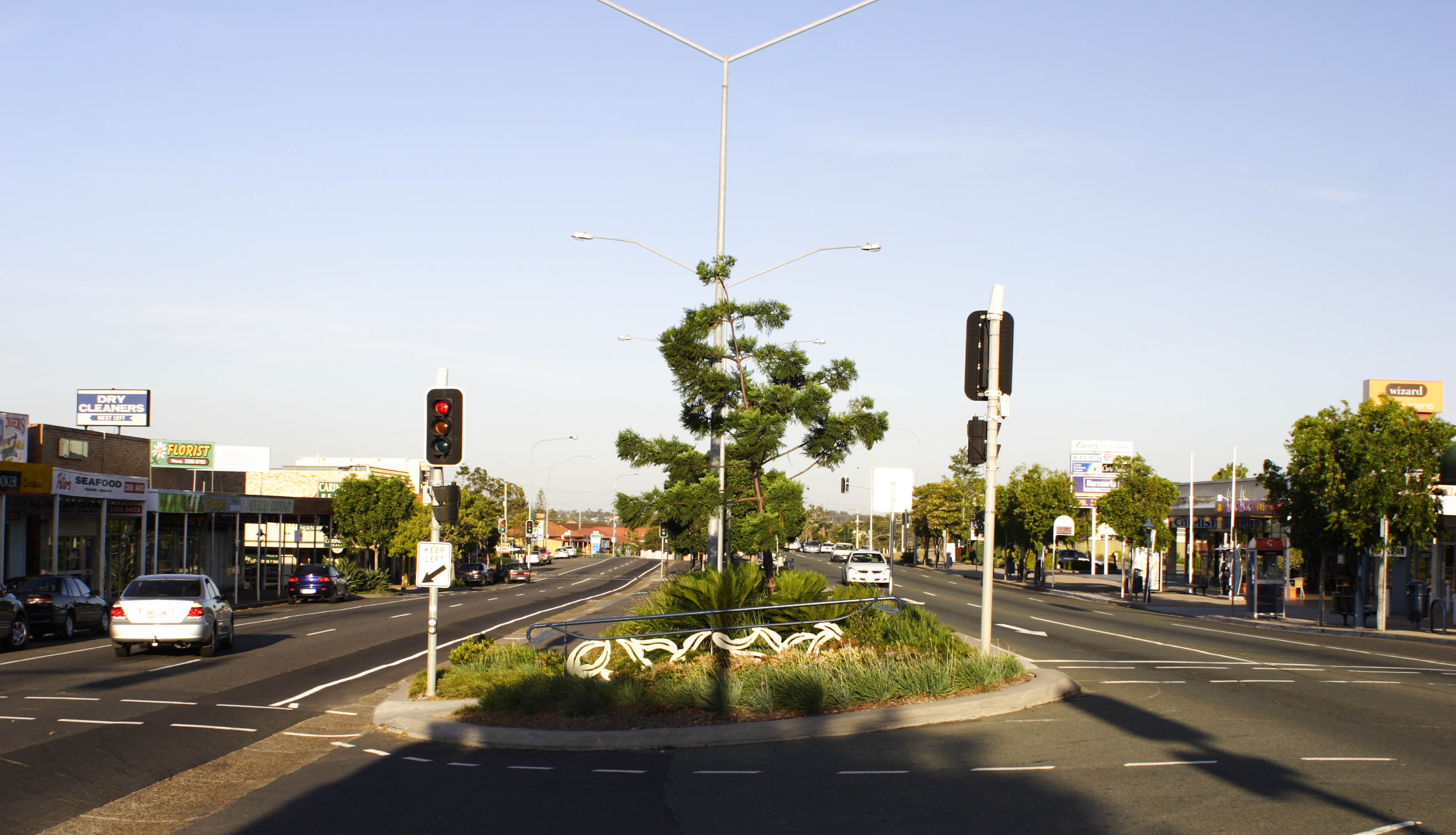
- Old Cleveland Road at Carina

General information
- Type: Road
- Length: 19.3 km (12 mi)
- Route number(s): State Route 22; State Route 30; State Route 54; State Route 55

Major junctions
- West end: Logan Road (State Route 95), Greenslopes
- East end: Old Cleveland Road East (State Route 55), Birkdale

Location(s)
- Major suburbs: Coorparoo, Camp Hill, Carina, Carindale, Chandler, Capalaba

Old Cleveland Road is a major road in Brisbane, Queensland. It runs 19.3 kilometres (12.0 mi) from Stones Corner to Capalaba in Brisbane, with most of the route signed as State Route 22. Sections of the road are also part of State Routes 30, 54, and 55. The road is the main route from inner Brisbane to Capalaba and Cleveland since New Cleveland Road only links Tingalpa with Capalaba.

The road provides the quickest access to the suburbs of Capalaba and Carindale from Logan Road and the Gateway Motorway, as well as being a main access road for Westfield Carindale Shopping Centre and Capalaba Central Shopping Centre. When completed the Eastern Busway will run parallel to, and (in some parts) in the middle of, the road so bus patrons can avoid severe peak hour traffic congestion road-wide.

== History ==
In 1839 and 1841 surveyors James Warner, Granville Stayplton and Robert Dixon were directed by incoming Lieutenant Owen Gorman to prepare the Moreton Bay Penal Colony for civil administration and private (rather than convict only) occupation. In particular Warner surveyed Norman Creek from (present day) Stones Corner, Hilliard's Creek and Tingalpa Creek to the Brisbane River, suggesting on his survey a road from Coopers Plains (then called Cowpers Plains) to Cleveland Point (the only eligible site that a mooted port could be located) along a line approximately 2.4 kilometres (1.5 mi) south of where Old Cleveland Road is today. A subsequent 1841 survey proposed a slightly different alignment, crossing over Tingalpa Creek only once.

In 1849, Major Thomas Mitchell, Surveyor-General of the Colony of New South Wales directed that a town at Cleveland Point be surveyed as per Warner's suggestion in the 1841 survey. Warner submitted his Survey of a practicable road from Brisbane in the County of Stanley to the proposed Town of Cleveland in the same County on 22 May 1850, the first definitive plan and (subsequent) construction of a road on the current's approximate alignment. The first sale of blocks of land at Cleveland occurred on 13 August 1851 after Warner submitted a survey of allotments for the new town on 25 April of that same year.

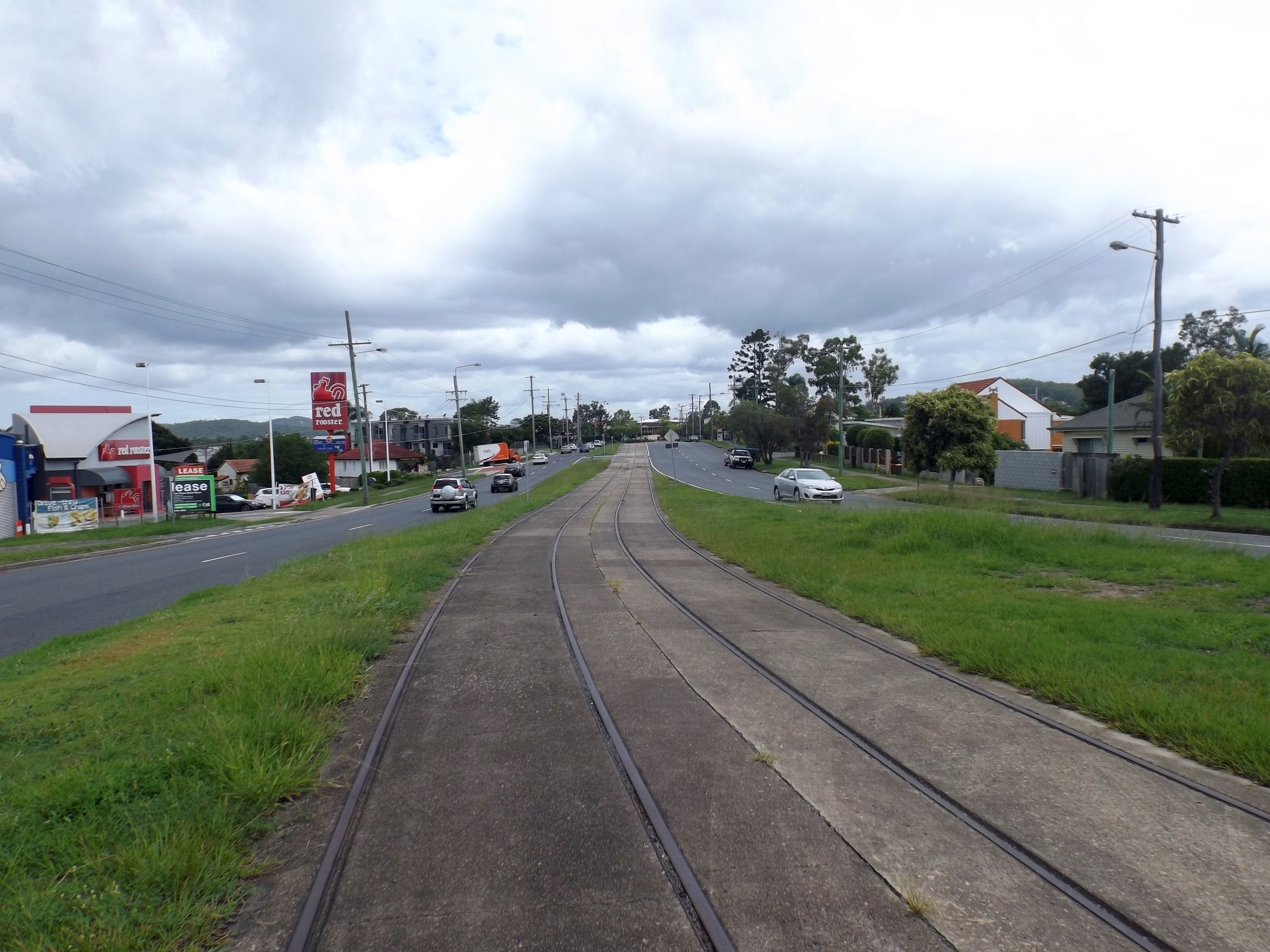
Tramway tracks at Carina, 2015

Old Cleveland Road's alignment was variously altered by various surveyors, including Warner and Gould, and the New South Wales and (subsequent) Queensland colonial and State governments until 1961, the route of which remains largely unchanged to this day. Oddly, a 1926 Brisbane City Council map called the road Cleveland Road whilst today's Mt. Gravatt-Capalaba Road was labelled by council as Old Cleveland Road. A 1975 Brisbane City Council proposal to rename the current Old Cleveland Road was halted after the Redland City council objected to the change.

Between 1912 and 1926, part of the Belmont Tramway ran along the road at Carina. Between 1948 and 1969, Brisbane City Council electric trams ran along Old Cleveland Road between Logan Road and Belmont. Approximately 625 m (684 yd) of tram track remains in the median strip between Jones Road to Orwell Street in Carina. This remaining tram track is listed on the Queensland Heritage Register.

== Landmarks ==
- Eastern Busway
- Westfield Carindale Shopping Centre
- Sleeman Centre
- Gateway Motorway
- Capalaba Central Shopping Centre
- Coorparoo State School and the Queen Alexandra Home Community Centre
- Camp Hill State Primary School
- Belmont State Primary School

== Upgrades ==
=== Intersection upgrade planning ===
A project to plan the upgrade of the intersection with Tilley Road, at a cost of $600,000, is expected to complete by late 2022.

=== Safety improvements ===
A project to provide safety improvements at three intersections, at a cost of $501,000, was to begin construction early in 2022.

=== Gateway on-ramp upgrade ===
A project to upgrade the Gateway on-ramp, at a cost of $5 million, was to be completed late in 2021.

== Major intersections ==
The entire road is in the Brisbane local government area.

Location	km	mi	Destinations	Notes
Greenslopes	0	0.0	Logan Road (State Routes 22 and 95) – west – Woolloongabba / Logan Road (no route number) – south–east – rejoins State Route 95 in Greenslopes	Western end of Old Cleveland Road (State Route 22); Western concurrency terminus with State Route 95
Greenslopes	0.21	0.13	Montague Street (State Route 95) – south – Logan Road / Laura Street – north – Greenslopes	Eastern concurrency terminus with State Route 95
Coorparoo	1.6	0.99	Cavendish Road (State Route 41) – north–west – East Brisbane / south–east – Holland Park	
Camp Hill	3.5	2.2	Boundary Road – south – Holland Park / Wiles Street – north – Seven Hills	
Carina–Carindale boundary	6.1	3.8	Creek Road – north – Cannon Hill / south – Upper Mount Gravatt	
Carindale / Belmont boundary	8.5	5.3	Gateway Motorway (M1) – north – Murarrie / south – Mackenzie	
Chandler	11.1	6.9	Tilley Road (State Route 30) – south – Mackenzie / north (no route number) – Gumdale	Western concurrency terminus with State Route 30
Chandler	12.8	8.0	Moreton Bay Road (State Route 22) – south–east – Capalaba	Old Cleveland Road continues east as State Route 30
Chandler	14.2	8.8	New Cleveland Road (State Route 30) – north–west – Capalaba	Old Cleveland Road continues south-east with no route number
Chandler	15.0	9.3	Mount Gravatt Capalaba Road (State Route 54) – south–west – Mackenzie / Camrose Street – north–east – Chandler	Old Cleveland Road continues south-east as State Route 54
Capalaba	15.4	9.6	Redland Bay Road (State Route 44) – south–east – Capalaba	
Capalaba	16.5	10.3	Moreton Bay Road (State Route 22) – south–west – Capalaba / Finucane Road (State Route 22) – east – Alexandra Hills	
Birkdale	18.5	11.5	Birkdale Road (State Route 54) – north–east – Birkdale	Old Cleveland Road continues south-east as State Route 55
Birkdale	19.3	12.0	Rossinton Street – south – Birkdale / Currawong Drive – north – Birkdale	Eastern end of Old Cleveland Road. State Route 55 continues east as Old Cleveland Road East
1.000 mi = 1.609 km; 1.000 km = 0.621 mi: Concurrency terminus; Route transition

== See also ==
- Ipswich Road
- Logan Road
- Road transport in Brisbane
