= Queen Alexandra Home =

Australian villa

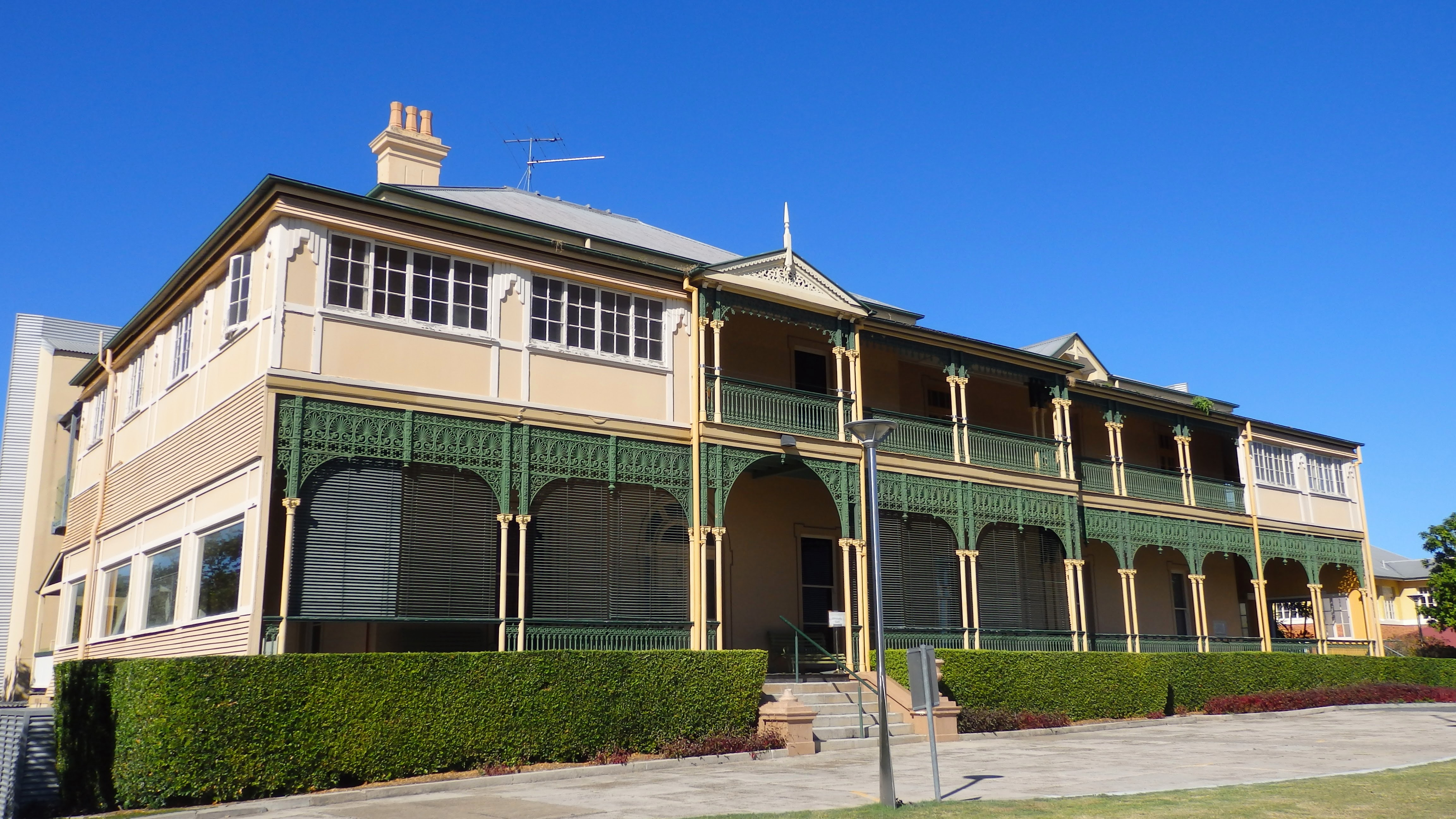
- Building in May 2016

- Location within Queensland Location within Australia
- 27.4939°S 153.061°E
- Location: 347 Old Cleveland Road, Coorparoo, City of Brisbane, Queensland, Australia

History
- Design period: 1870s–1890s (late 19th century)
- Built: 1886–1963

Queensland Heritage Register
- Official name: Queen Alexandra Home, Alexandra House – College of Catering and Hospitality Services, Alexandra House – College of Tourism and Hospitality, Hatherton/Queen Alexandra Home for Children
- Type: state heritage (landscape, built)
- Designated: 21 October 1992
- Reference no.: 600185
- Significant period: 1880s, 1910s, 1920s circa (fabric); 1886–1960 (historical); 1911–1960 (social)
- Significant components: residential accommodation – main house, wall/s – retaining, classroom/classroom block/teaching area, flagpole/flagstaff, driveway, memorial – gate/s, garden/grounds, service wing, basement / sub-floor, dormitory

Queen Alexandra Home is a heritage-listed villa at 347 Old Cleveland Road, Coorparoo, City of Brisbane, Queensland, Australia. It was built from 1886 to 1963. It is also known as Alexandra House, College of Tourism & Hospitality, Hatherton, and Queen Alexandra Home for Children. It was added to the Queensland Heritage Register on 21 October 1992.

== History ==
Hatherton, a two-storeyed brick residence was erected in 1886 near the intersection of Old Cleveland Road and Cavendish Road in Coorparoo. A wing, named Kingsbury, was added in 1919.

The design of Hatherton is attributed to the firm of John Hall and Son, and the contractor was Abraham James. Hatherton was built for Brisbane businessman Reuben Nicklin, manager of the Brisbane Office of Butler Brothers, Saddlers and Ironmongers. Prior to moving to Hatherton, Nicklin and his family lived at Langlands, also at Coorparoo, which had been built for Nicklin in the early 1880s. By the late 1880s, Coorparoo was still principally a rural area, despite several estates having been subdivided and the suburb being connected to South Brisbane by rail. The population of Coorparoo was small, and dispersed around the Old Cleveland and Cavendish Roads intersection.

Nicklin and his wife Jane Lahey drowned in February 1890, when the RMS Quetta sank in Torres Strait, en route to England. Their daughter Alice, was one of only two European women to survive the shipwreck.

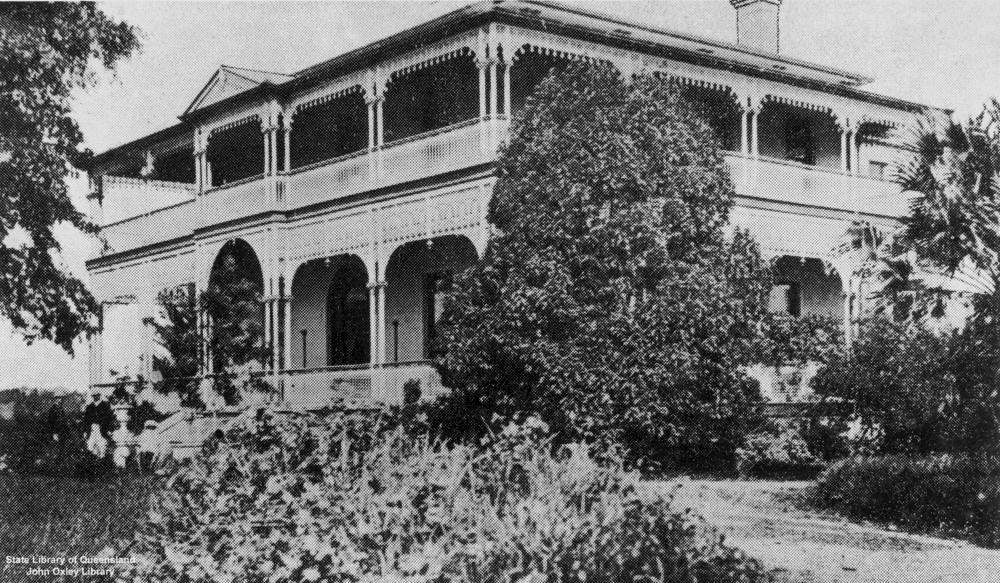
Queen Alexandra Home, 1911

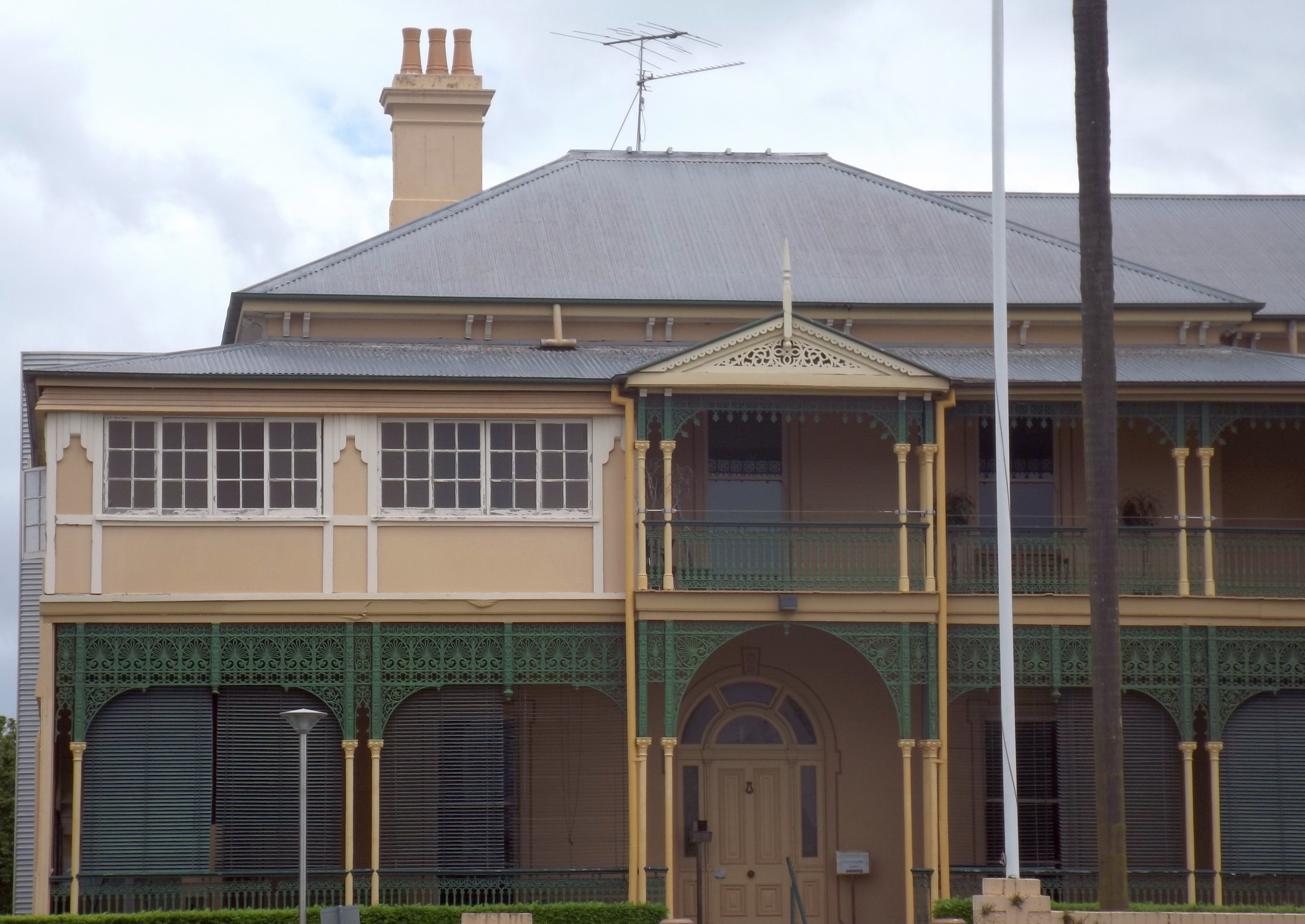
Eastern end of the residence, 2015

Hatherton was occupied by various people including members of the Nicklin and Lahey families as well as the Hon Arthur John Carter, Member of the Queensland Legislative Council, until 1911 when the building was acquired by the Methodist Church. The church had established its first children's home, named the Queen Alexandra Home for Children, the previous year at Robgill, in Indooroopilly, donated by May Jordan McConnel.

The home was managed and controlled by the Queen Alexandra Ladies' Committee. By 1911 the Home required additional room, and in December that year the staff and children were transferred from Indooroopilly to Hatherton. Hatherton was officially opened as the Queen Alexandra Home for Children in March 1912. The Nicklin family maintained their involvement with the place, as William Lahey Nicklin (son of Reuben Nicklin) was one of the trustees of the property for the Methodist Church.

By 1918 the Home was filled to capacity, and in 1919 tenders were called by architect HGO Thomas for brick additions to Queen Alexandra Home. The foundation stone of the additions was laid in October that year, and the contractor was Mr Hobbs. The new wing was named Kingsbury in memory of Mrs JJ Kingsbury, first president of the Home. Subsequent additions during the 1920s increased the capacity of the Home from fifty to 100 children. During the mid-1940s, day pupils from Somerville House were taught at the Home.

In 1958, the Methodist Church changed its policy on child care from institutional homes to group family homes, and the last children were transferred from the Home in 1960. The building was purchased by the Queensland Government and used by the Education Department for domestic science education. During this period, the building was known as Alexandra House.

In 1963, an annexe was constructed at the rear of the House, and from 1967 further facilities were added to the site. In 1977 the building became the College of Catering and Hospitality Services, Coorparoo, being renamed the College of Tourism and Hospitality (COTAH), in 1984.

Queen Alexandra Home was extensively refurbished for use as a community centre in 1986–87, and most of the additions and partitions in the Kingsbury wing were removed at this time.

== Description ==
Queen Alexandra Home, located on the crest of a rise fronting Old Cleveland Road to the northwest, is a two-storeyed rendered masonry building consisting of an 1886 section named Hatherton with a 1919 wing to the southwest called Kingsbury.

The building has a hipped corrugated iron roof to Hatherton and a gambrel roof to Kingsbury. It has verandahs to three sides and service buildings attached to the rear. The verandahs have cast iron balustrade, valance, brackets and paired columns. The northeast and southwest verandahs have been enclosed with multi-paned windows and hardboard panelling.

Hatherton is frontally symmetrical, with a slightly projecting gabled porch accessed by a short flight of steps with an arched valance above. The gable has a fretwork panel, decorative bargeboard and finial, and the main entry consists of an arched fanlight and sidelight assembly of etched glass with carved timber mouldings and panelled timber door. Step out sashes, with incised architraves, open to the verandahs on both levels. The rear of the building has a two-storeyed kitchen wing with a sub-floor room and covered walkways accessing adjacent structures.

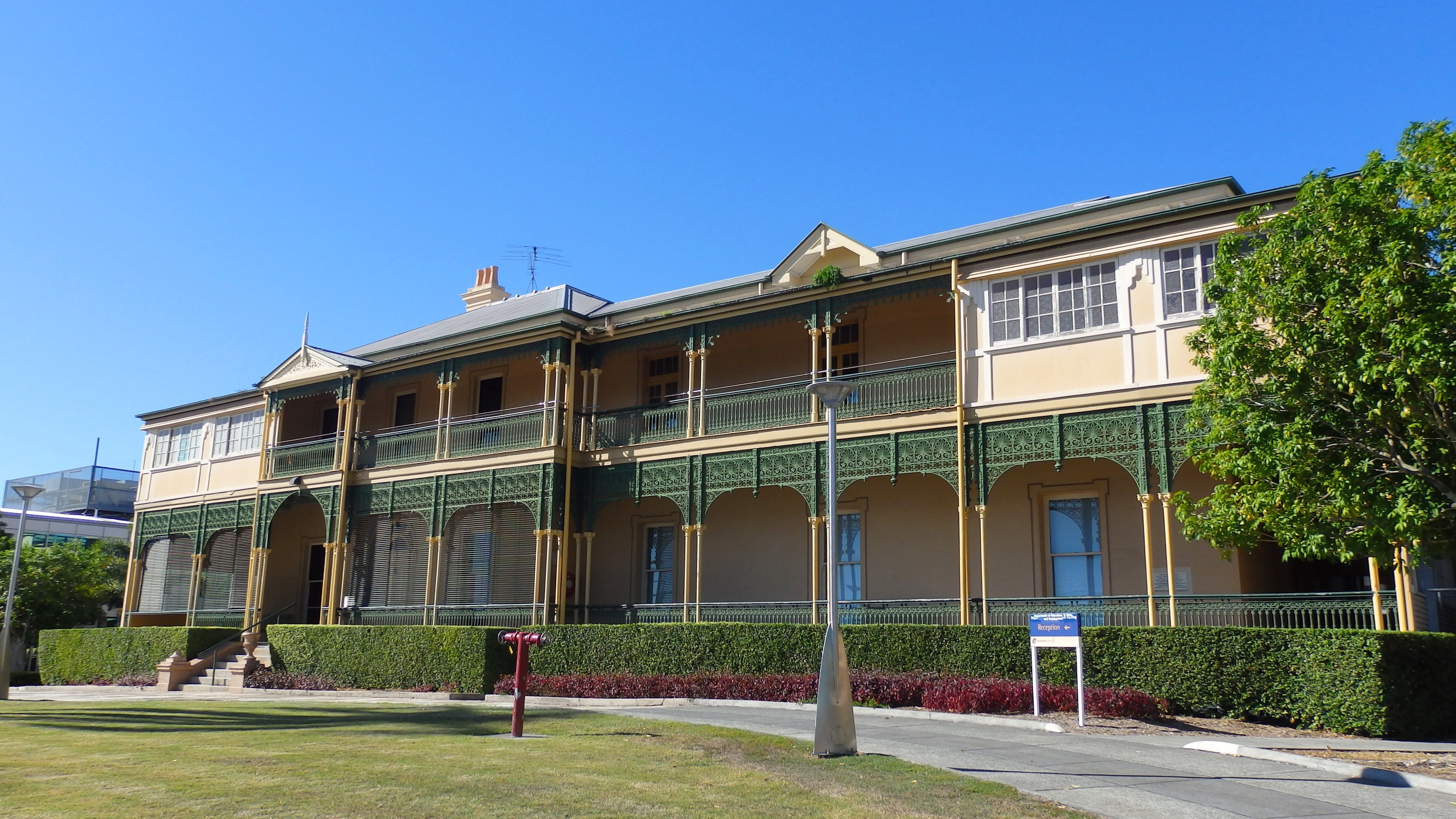
May 2016

Internally, Hatherton has a central corridor with a tiled foyer leading through an archway with plaster mouldings to a timber staircase. This has a cast iron balustrade, carved timber newel post, timber panelling and an arched leadlight sash window at the landing level. This space is decorated with a stencil dado, and has timber architraves, skirtings and panelled doors with glass fanlights. The ground floor has two rooms to the northeast, with the northern room having a white marble fireplace surround with painted tile inserts and the other having a darker marble surround with black stone in relief and painted tiles. The southwest side consists of one large room with a red and green marble fireplace surround, with painted tile inserts, at the southern end. The first floor consists of four rooms, with only the northern room containing a marble fireplace surround, but this has been damaged with the mantlepiece missing. A bar has been inserted on the southwest side and a dumb waiter at the rear connecting the kitchen below. Apart from the foyer, kitchen and bar, Hatherton is carpeted throughout.

Kingsbury, containing a large function room with two central timber columns to both floors, has French doors and step out sash windows, with incised architraves, opening to verandahs. Casement windows open to the rear, the ground floor is timber and the first floor is carpeted.

Attached to the southern corner is a single-storeyed weatherboard building with a corrugated iron gable roof and concrete stumps. This has been fitted out as toilet facilities.

To the south of the kitchen wing is a two-storeyed classroom structure with a corrugated fibrous cement gable roof. The ground floor is brick and the first floor is weatherboard, and it is linked to the rear of Hatherton by a covered timber walkway.

Queen Alexandra Home has a concrete driveway to the northwest with memorial metal gates fronting Old Cleveland Road. A masonry retaining wall fence encloses an area of lawn with rose beds and a central flag pole. The L-shaped College of Tourism and Hospitality surrounds the building from the northeast to the south, with small areas of garden on the northeast and car parking to the south. A driveway is located on the southwest boundary.

== Heritage listing ==
Queen Alexandra Home was listed on the Queensland Heritage Register on 21 October 1992 having satisfied the following criteria.

The place is important in demonstrating the evolution or pattern of Queensland's history.

The location of Queen Alexandra Home on Old Cleveland Road demonstrates the development of Coorparoo as a residential area from the 1880s.

The place is important because of its aesthetic significance.

Queen Alexandra Home, comprising a substantial 1880s masonry residence, has strong aesthetic qualities including the use of highly decorative cast iron.

The place has a strong or special association with a particular community or cultural group for social, cultural or spiritual reasons.

The building maintains a special association with the community and with the work of the Methodist Church, through its use as a children's home, college of further education and community centre.

The place has a special association with the life or work of a particular person, group or organisation of importance in Queensland's history.

The building maintains a special association with the community and with the work of the Methodist Church, through its use as a children's home, college of further education and community centre. The building is also associated with the Nicklin family, being erected for Reuben Nicklin.
