= Cavendish Road =

Road in Queensland, Australia

Cavendish Road Queensland

General information
- Type: Road
- Route number(s): State Route 41

Major junctions
- NW end: Off Stanley Street East, Coorparoo, near Norman Creek
- Stanley Street East (State Route 41); Old Cleveland Road (State Route 22); Holland Road (State Route 10)
- SE end: Newnham Road (State Route 41), Mt Gravatt East, near Creek Rd

Location(s)
- LGA(s): City of Brisbane
- Major suburbs: Coorparoo, Holland Park, Mount Gravatt East

Cavendish Road is an arterial road in Brisbane, Queensland, Australia, linking the suburbs of Coorparoo, Holland Park and Mount Gravatt East.

== Geography ==
Cavendish Road commences at Coorparoo Secondary College near Bridgewater Creek in Coorparoo and then runs in an approximately southeasterly direction over hilly terrain. It terminates at the intersection with Creek Road in Mount Gravatt East. Although the road appears to continue beyond that point, it becomes Newnham Road.

== History ==
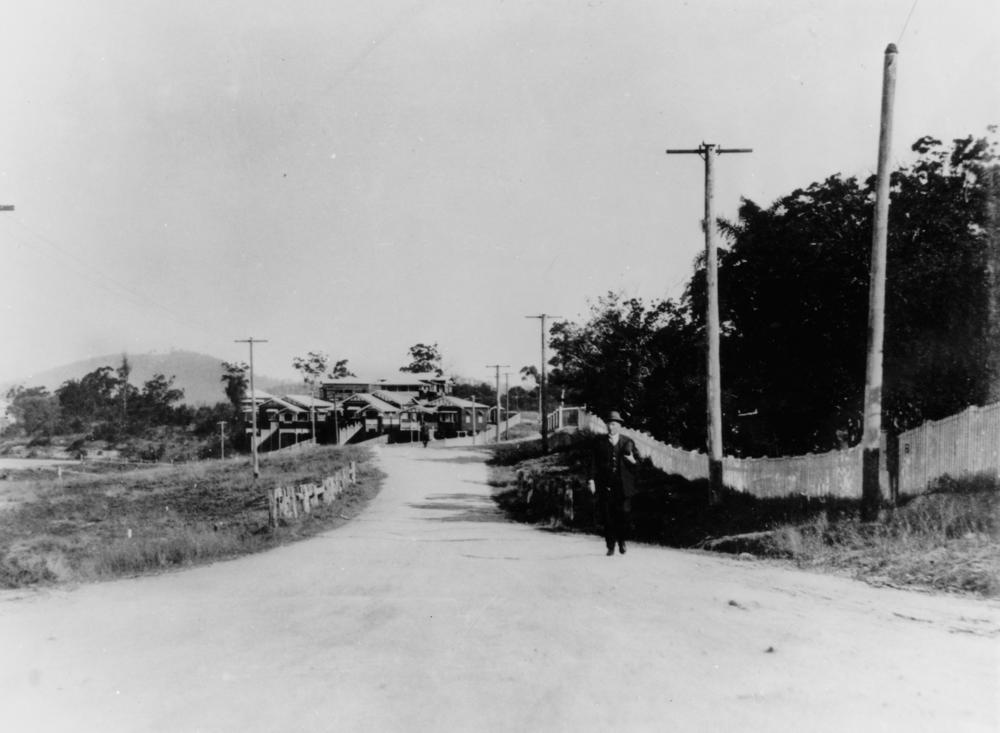
View along Cavendish Road, Coorparoo, circa 1929

The road first appears in a survey of Coorparoo in July 1863.

A number of the early residents were keen whist players and the book commonly known as Cavendish on Whist was considered the authority on the game. Cavendish was the pen name of English writer and whist player Henry Jones, who was a member of the Cavendish Whist Club. This is said to be the origin of the road name.

Cavendish Road State High School was constructed at 695 Cavendish Road in Holland Park. It opened on 9 April 1951.

== Landmarks ==
Significant landmarks on Cavendish Road include:

- No 208: the heritage-listed Coorparoo School of Arts and RSL Memorial Hall
- No 219: the heritage-listed former Coorparoo Fire Station

== Major intersections ==
The entire road is in the Brisbane local government area.

| Location | km | mi | Destinations | Notes |
|---|---|---|---|---|
| Coorparoo | 0 | 0.0 | Dead end (no adjoining roads or streets) | Northern end of Cavendish Road (no route number) |
| Coorparoo | 0.27 | 0.17 | Stanley Street East (State Route 41) – west – East Brisbane / east (no route number) – Norman Park | Cavendish Road continues south as State Route 41 |
| Coorparoo | 0.5 | 0.31 | Level crossing of Cleveland railway line | |
| Coorparoo | 1.2 | 0.75 | Old Cleveland Road (State Route 22) – west – Greenslopes/ east – Camp Hill | |
| Coorparoo | 2.5 | 1.6 | Chatsworth Road – west – Greenslopes east – Camp Hill | |
| Coorparoo–Holland Park boundary | 4.3 | 2.7 | Holland Road (State Route 10) – south–west – Holland Park / Boundary Road (State Route 10) – north–east – Camp Hill | |
| Holland Park | 5.3 | 3.3 | Wyncroft Street (becomes Pine Mountain Road) – east – Carindale | |
| Holland Park–Mount Gravatt East boundary | 5.7 | 3.5 | Nursery Road – south–west – Holland Park West | |
| Mount Gravatt East | 7.2 | 4.5 | Creek Road (State Route 20) – south–west – Mount Gravatt East / – north – Carindale | Southern end of Cavendish Road. State Route 41 continues south as Newnham Road. |
1.000 mi = 1.609 km; 1.000 km = 0.621 mi
