= Shire of Coorparoo =

Local government area of Queensland, Australia

Coordinates: 27.495°S 153.060°E

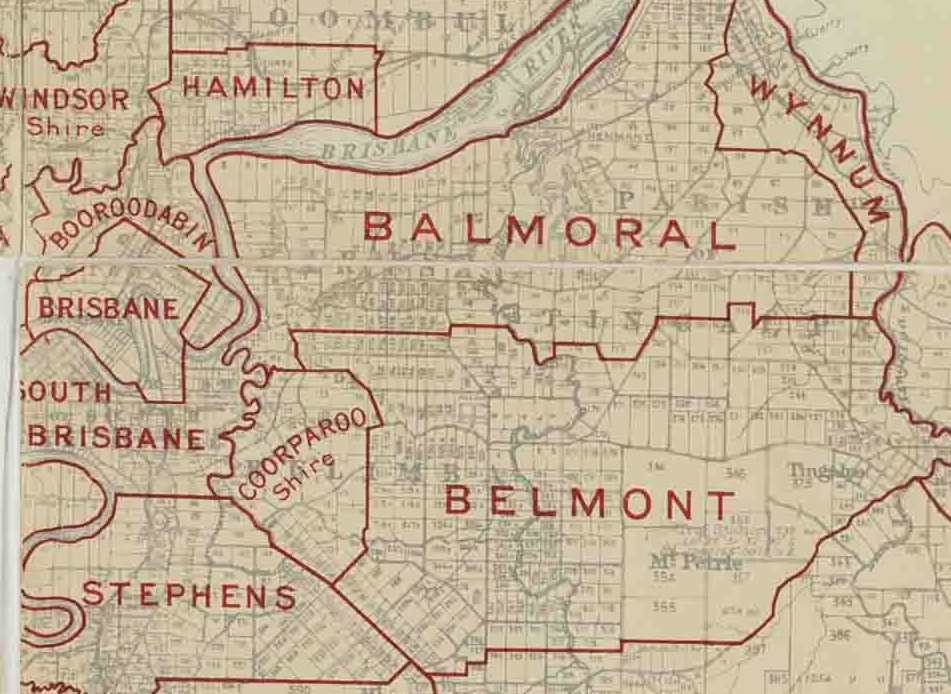
Map of Shire of Coorparoo and adjacent local government areas, March 1902

The Shire of Coorparoo is a former local government area of Queensland, Australia, located in eastern Brisbane.

== History ==
The Bulimba Division was created on 11 November 1879 under the Divisional Boards Act 1879 with a population of 2007. On 24 October 1888, the western portion of Bulimba Division was redesignated as the Shire of Coorparoo.

By 1892 the Councillors decided that a Shire Hall was a necessity. Two allotments on the corner of Cavendish Road and Council (now Halstead) streets were purchased. Henry Wallace Atkinson, a local architect, designed the Shire Hall and it was built by a Mr Allibone at a cost of £514, plus £78 for architect's fees and £14 for seating. The Council moved in on 7 October 1892.

On 1 October 1925, the shire was amalgamated into the City of Brisbane.

== Chairmen ==
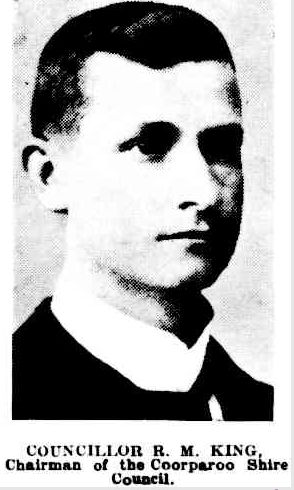
Reginald Macdonnell King, Chairman Coorparoo Shire Council, 1911

The chairmen of Cooparoo Shire were:

- 1888–1889: Frederick Thomas Brentnall (also a Member of the Queensland Legislative Council)
- 1890:
- 1891: George Valentine Hellicar
- 1892–1894: Walter Henry Barnes (also a Member of the Queensland Legislative Assembly for Bulimba and Wynnum)
- 1895: A. McCorkindale
- 1896: George Henry Blocksidge
- 1897: J. V. Francis
- 1898–1899: Reginald Macdonnell King (also a Member of the Queensland Legislative Assembly for Logan)
- 1900: Walter Henry Barnes
- 1901: Thomas Rees
- 1902: Reginald Macdonnell King
- 1903: Sydney Robertson
- 1904–1905: Alexander Morrison Kirkland
- 1906: Walter Henry Barnes
- 1907: Reginald Macdonnell King
- 1908: Frank Thomas Edmonds
- 1909: Sydney Robertson
- 1910: Allan Carswell Wylie
- 1911–1913: Reginald Macdonnell King
- 1914: John Lackey
- 1915: Alexander McKinnon
- 1916:
- 1917: Allan Carwwell Wylie
- 1918: Arthur William Soden
- 1919: John Smith Bennett
- 1920–1921: J. W. Ewart
- 1922: Reginald Macdonnell King
- 1923: Walter Henry Barnes
- 1924–25: John Innes Brown (also a Member of the Queensland Legislative Assembly for Logan)
