= Seven Hills, Queensland =

Seven Hills
- Suburb
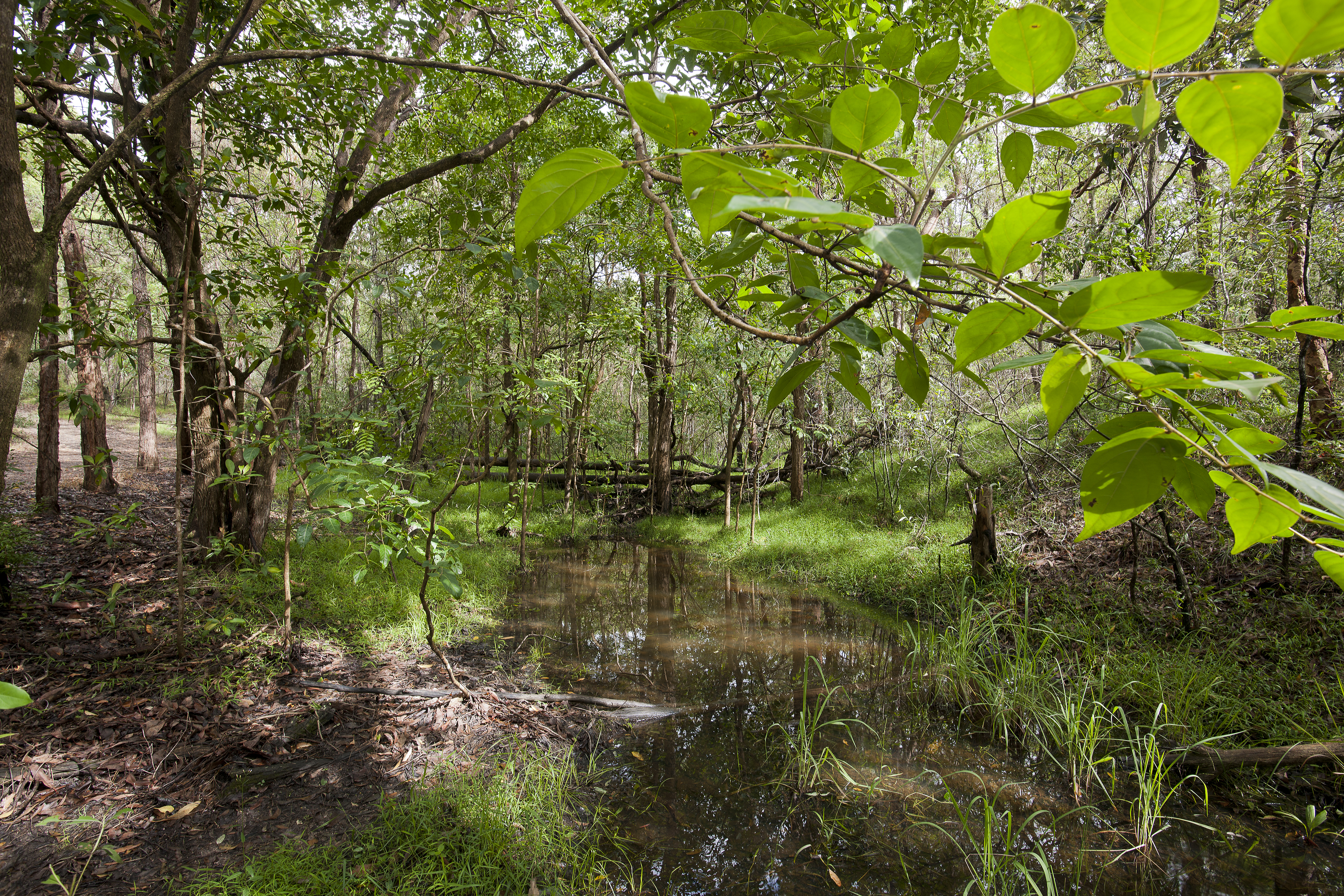
- Seven Hills Bushland Reserve

- Interactive map of Seven Hills
- Coordinates: 27.4791°S 153.075°E
- Country: Australia
- State: Queensland
- City: Brisbane
- LGA: City of Brisbane (Morningside Ward)
- Location: 7.8 km (4.8 mi) E of Brisbane CBD

Government
  - State electorates: Bulimba; Chatsworth
  - Federal division: Griffith

Area
  - Total: 1.6 km^{2} (0.62 sq mi)

Population
  - Total: 2,732 (2021 census)
  - Density: 1,710/km^{2} (4,420/sq mi)
- Time zone: UTC+10:00 (AEST)
- Postcode: 4170
Suburbs around Seven Hills
Morningside	Morningside	Cannon Hill
Norman Park	Seven Hills	Carina
Norman Park	Norman Park	Camp Hill

Seven Hills is a suburb in the City of Brisbane, Queensland, Australia. In the 2021 census, Seven Hills had a population of 2,732 people.

== Geography ==
Seven Hills is located 7.8 kilometres (4.8 mi) by road east of the Brisbane GPO. It borders Camp Hill, Carina, Cannon Hill, Morningside, and Norman Park.

As the name suggests, there are seven hills and the suburb and the hills themselves take their names from the Seven Hills of Rome. The seven hills are:

- Palatine Hill, circled by Aemelia Avenue (27.4786°S 153.0687°E), named after Palatine Hill in Rome
- Capitoline Hill, circled by Appia Avenue (27.4795°S 153.0699°E), named after Capitoline Hill in Rome
- Quirinal Hill, on Quirinal Crescent (27.4803°S 153.0714°E), named after Quirinal Hill in Rome
- Aventine Hill, on Aventine Avenue (27.4808°S 153.0736°E), named after Aventine Hill in Rome
- Caelian Hill, on Caelian Street (27.4830°S 153.0788°E), named after Caelian Hill in Rome
- Viminal Hill, on Viminal Hill Crescent (27.4869°S 153.0798°E), named after Viminal Hill in Rome
- Esquiline Hill (27.4826°S 153.0815°E), named after Esquiline Hill in Rome

All are within the current boundaries of the suburb, except for Esquiline Hill which is in the neighbouring suburb of Camp Hill on Tranters Avenue. Also there is another hill in the suburb of Seven Hills, Lilian Hill (27.4809°S 153.0789°E) which is not named after one of the Seven Hills of Rome.

== History ==
The name of the area first appeared in local maps in 1891 and 1895, when it was in the possession of landowners David Ham, John James Kingsbury (Ham's son-in-law) and Acheson Overend. The name was taken from the "Seven Hills Estate Co", a mining company whose own name reflected the terrain of the Creswick area north of Ballarat and of which Ham was a prominent shareholder. The 1925 sub-division plan submitted by new owner and land developer Robert George Oates, incorporated Roman street names.

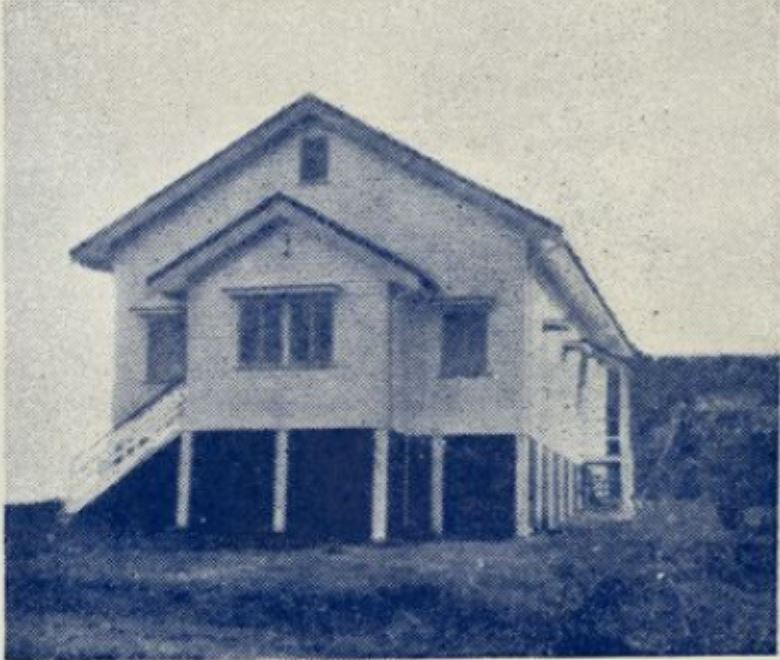
Seven Hills Presbyterian Church, at the time of opening, 1951

Between 1912 and 1926, the southern edge of the suburb was serviced by the Belmont Tramway which connected with the Queensland Government Railway at Norman Park. Initially the service was operated by the Belmont Shire Council until it was suspended in 1924. The service was reinstated by the Brisbane City Council in 1925 following the amalgamation of the local government authorities, but was again suspended in 1926. The tracks, which followed the present Oateson Skyline Drive and Ferguson Road and continued to Belmont along Old Cleveland Road, remained in place until 1934.

The Seven Hills Presbyterian Church opened on 1 July 1951 at 2 Servius Street (27.48251°S 153.07562°E). It was a timber building, capable of seating 200 people. In 1972, the church building was relocated to Carina.

In 1953, the Brisbane City Council commenced a trolley-bus service, which connected the suburb with Fortitude Valley via Stanley Street, terminating just off Oateson Skyline Drive. The trolley-bus service ceased operation on 13 March 1969, when diesel buses took over the service.

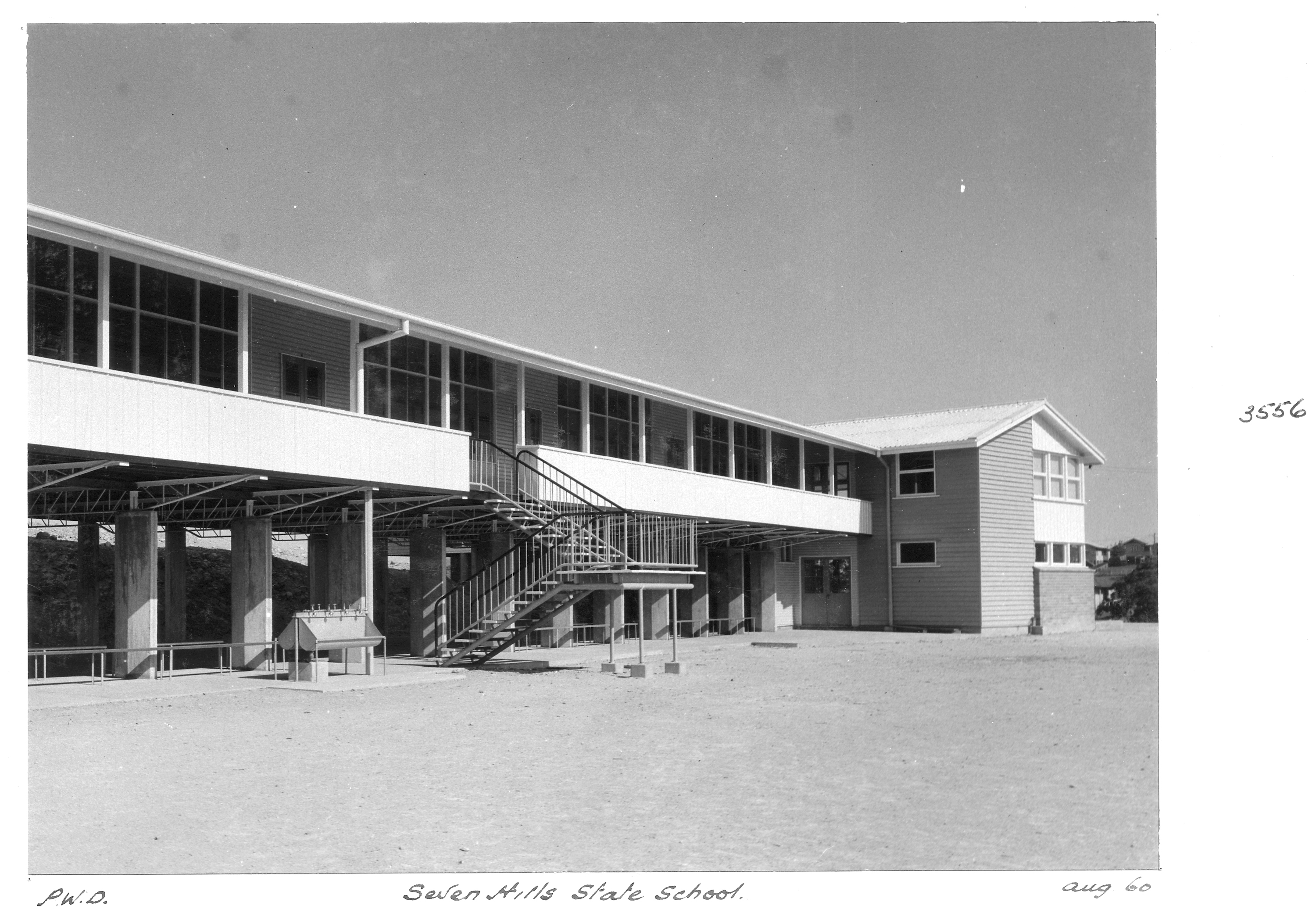
Seven Hills State School, 1960

Seven Hills State School opened on 25 January 1960 with an initial enrolment of 84 students rising to 141 students by the end of the first year.

On 1 June 2001, Seven Hills was gazetted as a suburb by the Queensland Government, following a push by local residents to have it recognised independently of Norman Park.

A Southbank Institute of Technology campus was operational in the suburb until 2010. The site has since become the Clearview Urban Village.

== Demographics ==
At the 2011 census, Seven Hills had a population of 2,028 people, of whom 50% were female and 50% were male. The median age of the population was 35; 2 years below the Australian median. 80.6% of people living in Seven Hills were born in Australia, with the next most common countries of birth being England (3.6%), New Zealand (3.6%), South Africa (0.8%), India (0.6%), and the United States (0.6%). 90.3% of people spoke English as their first language, while the other most common responses were Japanese (0.6%), Mandarin (0.6%), Spanish (0.5%), Tagalog (0.4%), and German (0.4%).

In the 2016 census, Seven Hills had a population of 2,211 people.

In the 2021 census, Seven Hills had a population of 2,732 people.

== Education ==
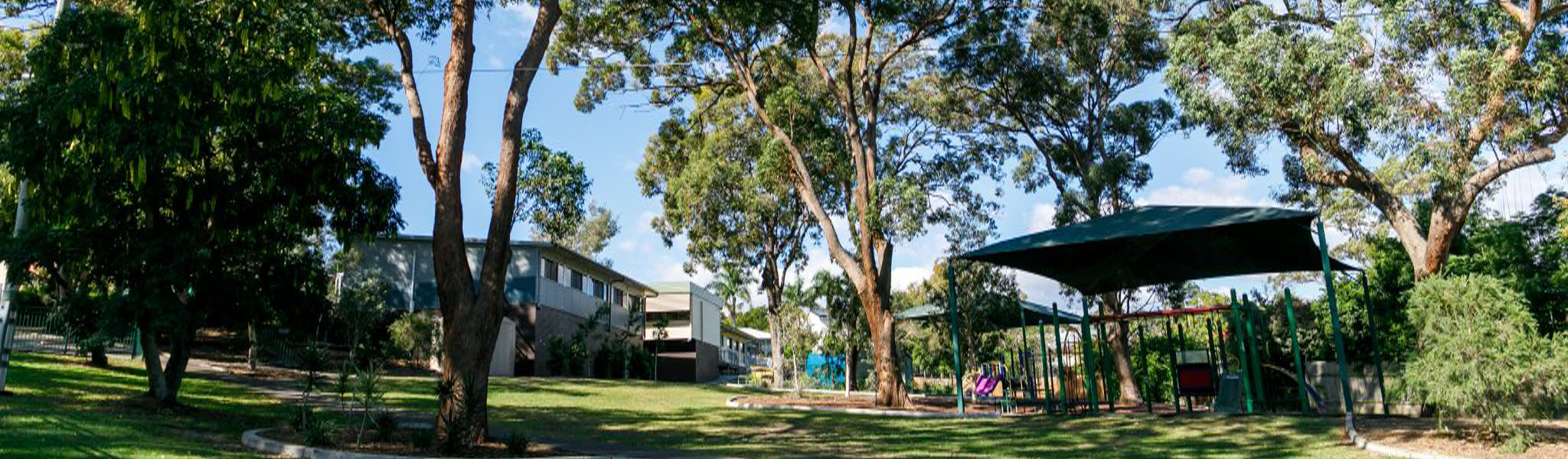
Seven Hill State School, 2023

Seven Hills State School is a government primary (Prep–6) school for boys and girls at 152 D'Arcy Road (27.4794°S 153.0747°E). In 2018, the school had an enrolment of 522 students with 38 teachers (33 full-time equivalent) and 25 non-teaching staff (14 full-time equivalent). It includes a special education program.

There are no secondary schools in Seven Hills. The nearest government secondary schools are Balmoral State High School in Balmoral to the north, Whites Hill State College in neighbouring Camp Hill to the south-east, and Coorparoo Secondary College in Coorparoo to the south-west.

== Public transport ==
There has been no railway station in Seven Hills since the closure of the Belmont Tramway in 1926, but Norman Park and Morningside stations are within walking distance of the western side of the suburb. Three radial bus corridors serve the suburb. Two express bus routes alternate to provide a connection between the Brisbane central business district and Cannon Hill Shopping Centre bus station along a corridor that passes through Seven Hills. One all-stops bus route passes centrally through Seven Hills on a route connecting Fortitude Valley and Carindale Shopping Centre. A peak route and an all-stops route connect Fortitude Valley and Cannon Hill Shopping Centre, passing along the southern border of Seven Hills.

== Cycling and walking ==
The main thoroughfare of Oateson Skyline Drive includes bicycle lanes, which continue southward along Wiles Street, Camp Hill and provide connectivity with the citywide bicycle network.

There is a network of narrow, and generally steep heritage walking paths located within public easements between residential properties. The smaller local streets and the major roads mostly have paved footpaths on one or both sides. Oateson Skyline Drive is median-divided and contains kerb extensions that promote safe pedestrian crossing. Aside from a small number of local parks, the major recreational walking attraction is the 52 Hectare Seven Hills Bushland Reserve located on the north east side of the suburb. The reserve contains a signed network of tracks for walking and fire access.
