= Old Cleveland Road Tramway Tracks =

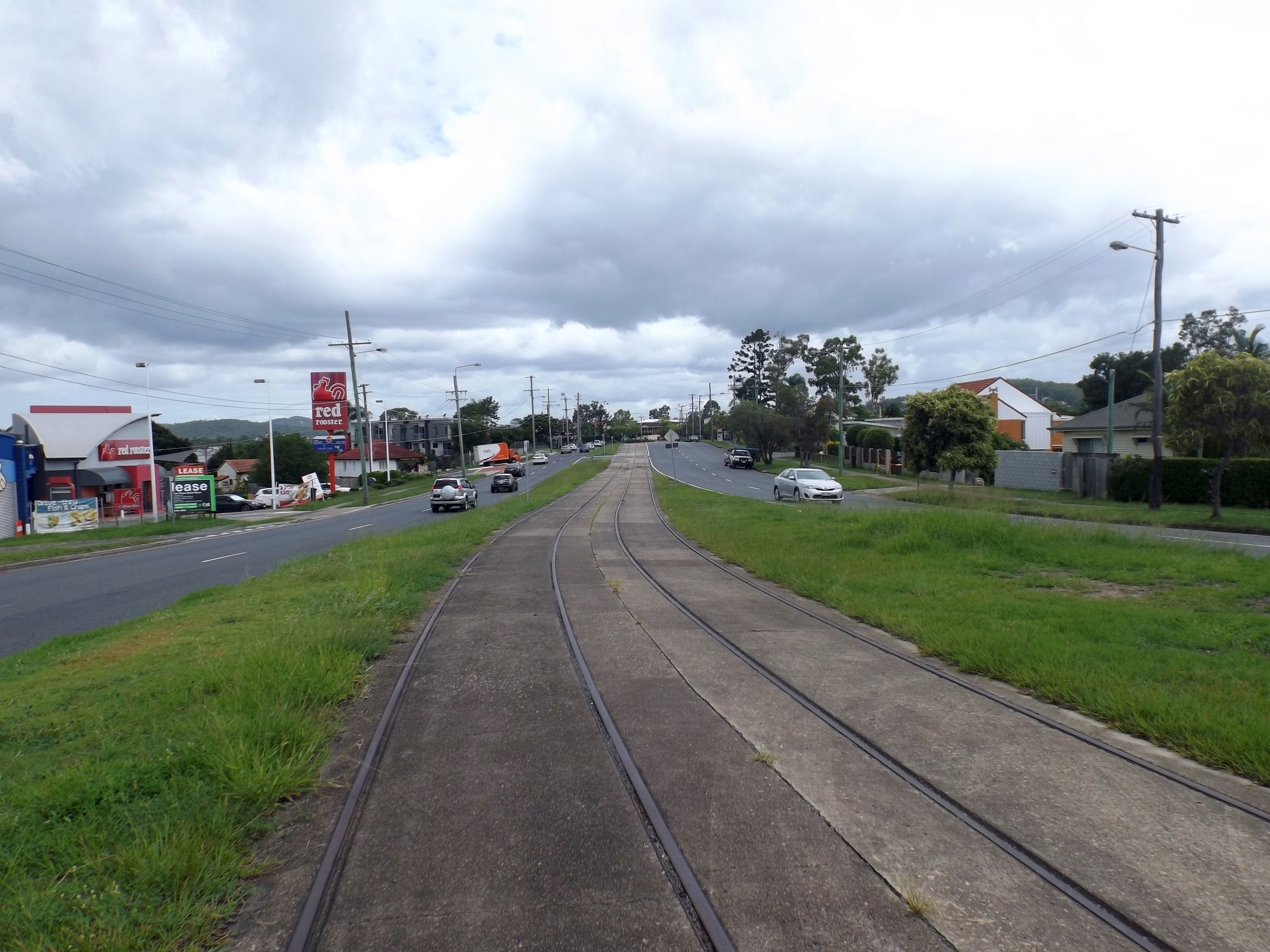
- Tracks in 2015

- Location within Queensland Location within Australia
- 27.4955°S 153.0863°E
- Location: Old Cleveland Road, Camp Hill & Carina, City of Brisbane, Queensland, Australia

History
- Design period: 1940s–1960s (post-World War II)
- Built: 1948

Queensland Heritage Register
- Official name: Old Cleveland Road Tramway Tracks, Belmont Electric Tramway
- Type: state heritage (built)
- Designated: 24 March 2000
- Reference no.: 601839
- Significant period: 1940s (fabric); 1912–1926 (historical – Belmont Tramway route); 1948–1969 (BCC tram route)
- Significant components: tramway
- Builders: Brisbane City Council

Old Cleveland Road Tramway Tracks is a heritage-listed tramway along Old Cleveland Road in Camp Hill and Carina, adjoining suburbs in the City of Brisbane, Queensland, Australia. It was built in 1948 by Brisbane City Council. It is also known as Belmont Electric Tramway. It was added to the Queensland Heritage Register on 24 March 2000.

== History ==
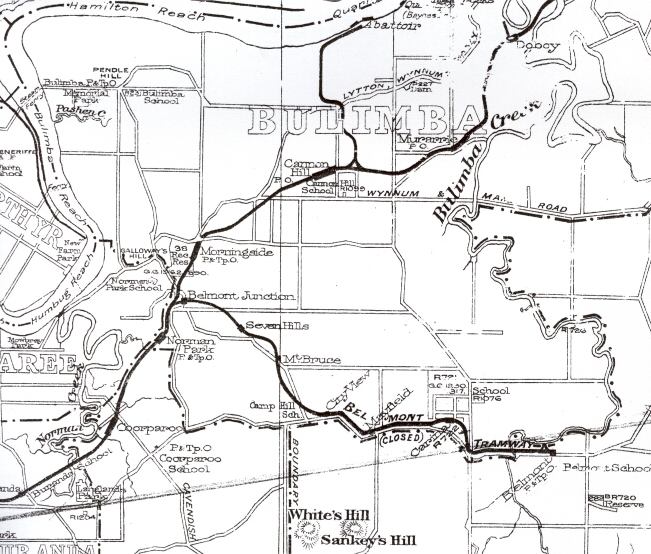
Belmont Tramway map, 1915

The Old Cleveland Road tramway tracks were laid in 1948 by Brisbane City Council as part of Brisbane's tramway system. They replaced earlier tracks belonging to the Belmont Tramway, constructed in 1912 by the Belmont Shire Council. The line ceased operation in 1969 when the entire Brisbane tramway system was closed by the Brisbane City Council.

Trams were a feature of the Brisbane cityscape for over eighty years. The first, horse-drawn trams plied their way from North Quay to Breakfast Creek and the Exhibition Building in 1885. Until 1922 the tramway was operated by private companies who saw the potential of a tramway to aid the sale of land. During this period, trams were changed from horse-powered, to electric, and the tramway network grew from 20 cars servicing 24 kilometres (15 mi) of tramway lines, to 181 cars travelling along 68 kilometres (42 mi) of double track. One extension of the period was that which stretched from Stones Corner to Coorparoo, and which, when opened in 1909, formed the nucleus of later extensions to Camp Hill and Belmont (now Carina).

Early in the twentieth century, Belmont was a sparsely populated, "outer" suburb of Brisbane, under the control of the Belmont Shire Council. The area did not enjoy the services of the Brisbane tramway network, to which the Belmont Council responded with the construction of the Belmont (steam) Tramway, opened in May 1912. It was a narrow-gauge 3 ft 6 in tramway track, laid with 42-pound (19 kg) rails on timber sleepers. The line was operated by the Railway Department with two return trips each day except Sundays. This was later increased to three and four trains per day to attract suburban growth. In 1922, the Belmont Shire Council lobbied for a railway to Redland Bay to extend the Belmont Tramway. The suggestion was rejected however, and the line was constructed via Cleveland instead. The Belmont Shire Council did not have the resources to continue the operation of the tramway, and the line closed on 16 April 1924.

From 1 January 1923, Brisbane's tramways passed into government ownership. The Brisbane Tramway Trust, under the authority of the Queensland Government, controlled the tramways until the creation of Greater Brisbane in 1925. During this time, the Trust was very active in acquiring new tram cars, and making an extension of 11 kilometres (6.8 mi) to the city's track network. One extension, completed in January 1925, was along the Coorparoo line to Camp Hill, from Cavendish Road to Bruce Street.

In December 1925, the Brisbane City Council inherited the 80 kilometres (50 mi) Brisbane tramway network, as well as the former Belmont Shire Council's Tramway. The Belmont Tramway had reopened in April 1925, however this proved to be a temporary arrangement. The losses incurred in the running of the line led to its second and final closure in October 1926. Belmont residents were linked by private feeder bus to the Brisbane electric tramway network, and the rails of the Belmont Tramway were removed in 1935.

With the Brisbane City Council's acquisition of the Brisbane tramway network, the upgrading and extension of the system continued. Large numbers of new trams were built and in 1933–34 the Council's distinctive technique of mass concrete tram tracks were first used extensively in Queen Street. Steel ties were used instead of sleepers, with the whole of the track, except on curves, set in solid concrete. Standard railway rails were used with a groove in the concrete for the wheel flange, and guard plates were bolted to the rails on curves to form a groove. These concrete tracks required less maintenance, and formed an excellent road surface for other vehicles.

In the years following World War II, Brisbane experienced a housing boom which induced the Brisbane City Council to extend its electric tramway network. Belmont (now Carina) was one of the new housing areas to be serviced by an extension to the Coorparoo tramline, opened in July 1948. The new portion of the line ran from Bruce Street to Mayfield Road, and constituted a double-track route extension of 1,550 metres (5,090 ft). The remnant surviving along Old Cleveland Road forms part of the 1948 line extension. This track was a standard-gauge track (1,435 millimetres (56.5 in)) consisting of steel sleepers and 80-pound rail set in mass concrete. Of the 1,550 metres (5,090 ft) extension, 664 metres (2,178 ft) utilised the road-bed of the former Belmont Tramway, between Orwell Street and Mayfield Road.

Extension of the tramway network continued throughout the 1950s. By 1959 more than 140 kilometres (87 mi) were laid in mass concrete. Mondays to Fridays, a total of 246 trams provided morning peak services, while evening peak traffic requirements needed 296 cars. Throughout the day, each route was serviced by a tram every ten minutes. During the following decade, however, various influences led to the eventual closure of Brisbane's tram system in April 1969. In September 1962, the Paddington tram depot was burnt to the ground with the loss of 65 trams, or twenty per cent of the council fleet. Three years later, a report on the future transport and traffic requirements of Brisbane, the Wilbur Smith Plan, was released. The report recommended the closure of the tramway system via a tram to bus conversion program. To this end, express buses were introduced along the Belmont and Mount Gravatt tram routes as supplementary services in 1966, followed by the addition of express buses to four more tram routes in 1967. In this year, an order for 204 rear engine diesel buses was increased to 340. In 1967–68, the Belmont route was cut back forty metres along Old Cavendish Road, to Jones Road. On 21 June 1968, Lord Mayor Clem Jones officially announced the conversion of all tramway routes to diesel bus operation, to be effected during the 1968–69 financial year.

Brisbane's tramway system closed on 13 April 1969. The final day had a carnival atmosphere, and an estimated 73,000 people used the tramway on the last day. The Paddington depot fire and the Wilbur Smith Plan were important influences on the City Council's decision to abandon tram services; however other trends also contributed to its demise. The increasing ownership of the private motor car; urban sprawl which saw more and more families move to outer suburbs not connected to the tram system, and lack of investment in the technological development of trams compared with diesel buses, all contributed to the conversion of Brisbane's trams to buses. With the closure of the Brisbane trams, Melbourne became the only Australian capital with a large scale tramway system.

== Description ==
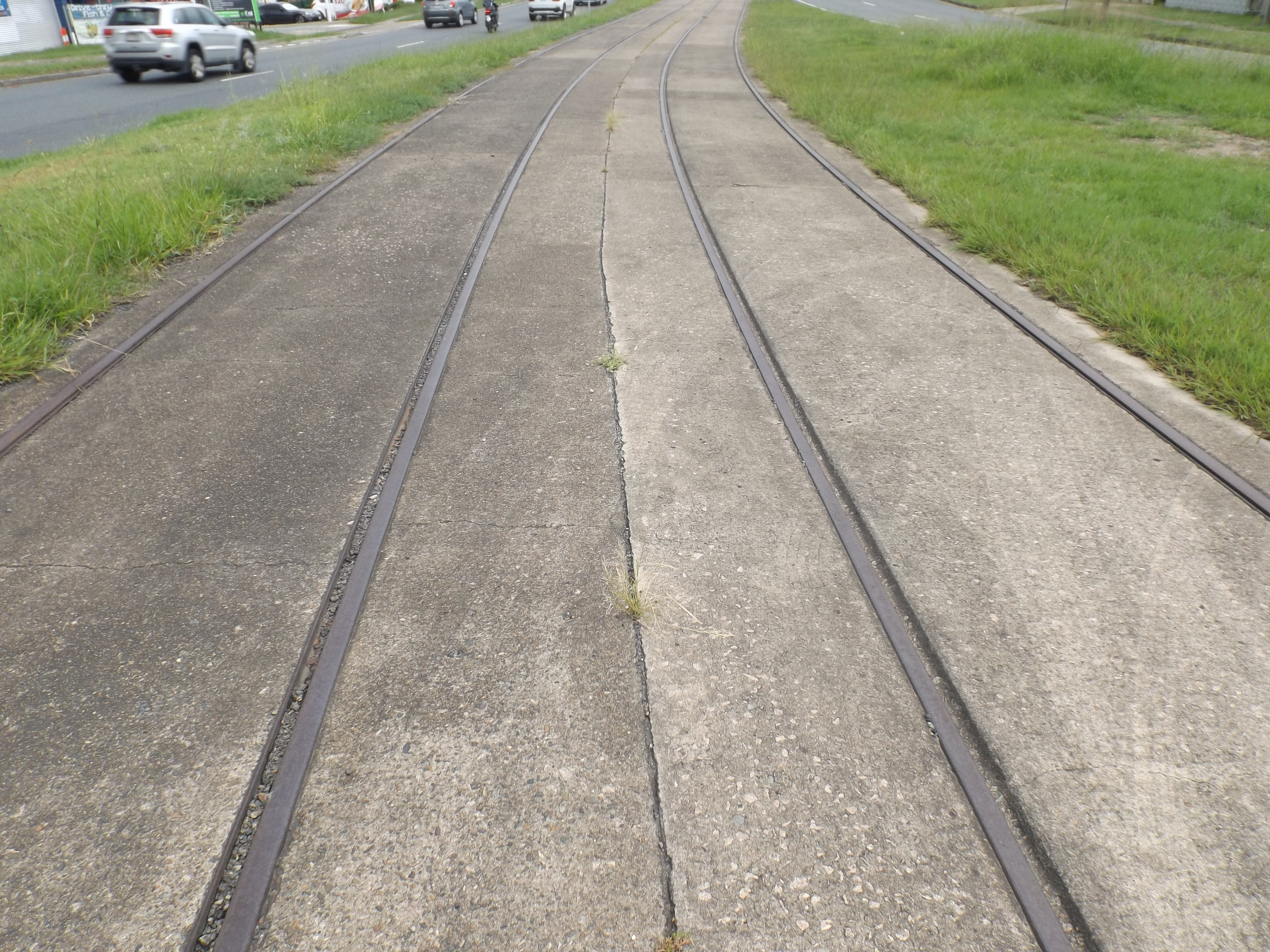
Tracks in 2015

The Old Cleveland Road Tramway Tracks stretch for a distance of approximately 625 metres (2,051 ft) along the centre of Old Cleveland Road, from Jones Road to Orwell Street. They are a double line set in a concrete "pavement" approximately four metres wide. A grassed verge follows both sides of the concrete pavement for most of the tracks' distance. Shrubs and small trees are sparsely scattered along the grassed areas.

The tramway tracks are standard gauge, with a width of 1,435 millimetres, and are laid using 80-pound rails (except on curves). The curves near Orwell and Wonersh Streets are a heavier grooved, or guarded rail.

Near the Jones Road end of the tramway tracks, a section of the concrete and steel tramway is used for parking. The tramway tracks are clearly visible in this section and the creation and use of the parking facilities have had little impact on the tramway. Small traffic islands have been constructed over the tram lines at two intervals along the remainder of the tramway tracks where streets intersect with Old Cleveland Road.

== Heritage listing ==
Old Cleveland Road Tramway Tracks was listed on the Queensland Heritage Register on 24 March 2000 having satisfied the following criteria.

The place is important in demonstrating the evolution or pattern of Queensland's history.

Old Cleveland Road Tramway Tracks are important in demonstrating the pattern of Queensland's history as this portion of the tramway utilised the road bed of the earlier Belmont Tramway, established in 1912 by the Belmont Shire Council. Throughout Queensland, various Shire Councils undertook the construction of tramways which often represented a significant capital investment for relatively small communities. The tramway tracks also demonstrate the pattern of Queensland's history as an example of the Brisbane tramway system which operated from 1885 until 1969. The tramway tracks also demonstrate the expansion of the system into new residential suburbs in the post World War II era. The eventual closure of the tramway system further demonstrates the evolution of Queensland's history, as the forces of urban sprawl, the predominance of the motor car, and the perceived future transport needs of Brisbane city influenced the decision to close the tramway.

The place demonstrates rare, uncommon or endangered aspects of Queensland's cultural heritage.

Old Cleveland Road Tramway Tracks demonstrate rare aspects of Queensland's cultural heritage as some of the last visible remnant tramway tracks in Brisbane. Other tracks have been removed, or covered over with bitumen road surfacing.

The place has potential to yield information that will contribute to an understanding of Queensland's history.

Old Cleveland Road Tramway Tracks have the potential to yield information about the construction of mass concrete tramway tracks.

The place is important in demonstrating a high degree of creative or technical achievement at a particular period.

Old Cleveland Road Tramway Tracks are important in demonstrating a high degree of technical achievement. Brisbane City Council pioneered the use of mass concrete tram tracks; in other cities concrete had been used as a foundation only.

The place has a special association with the life or work of a particular person, group or organisation of importance in Queensland's history.

Old Cleveland Road Tramway Tracks have a special association with the work of the Brisbane City Council's Transport Department who were responsible for the operation of the tramway from 1925 to 1969.
