= Carina, Queensland =

Carina
- Suburb
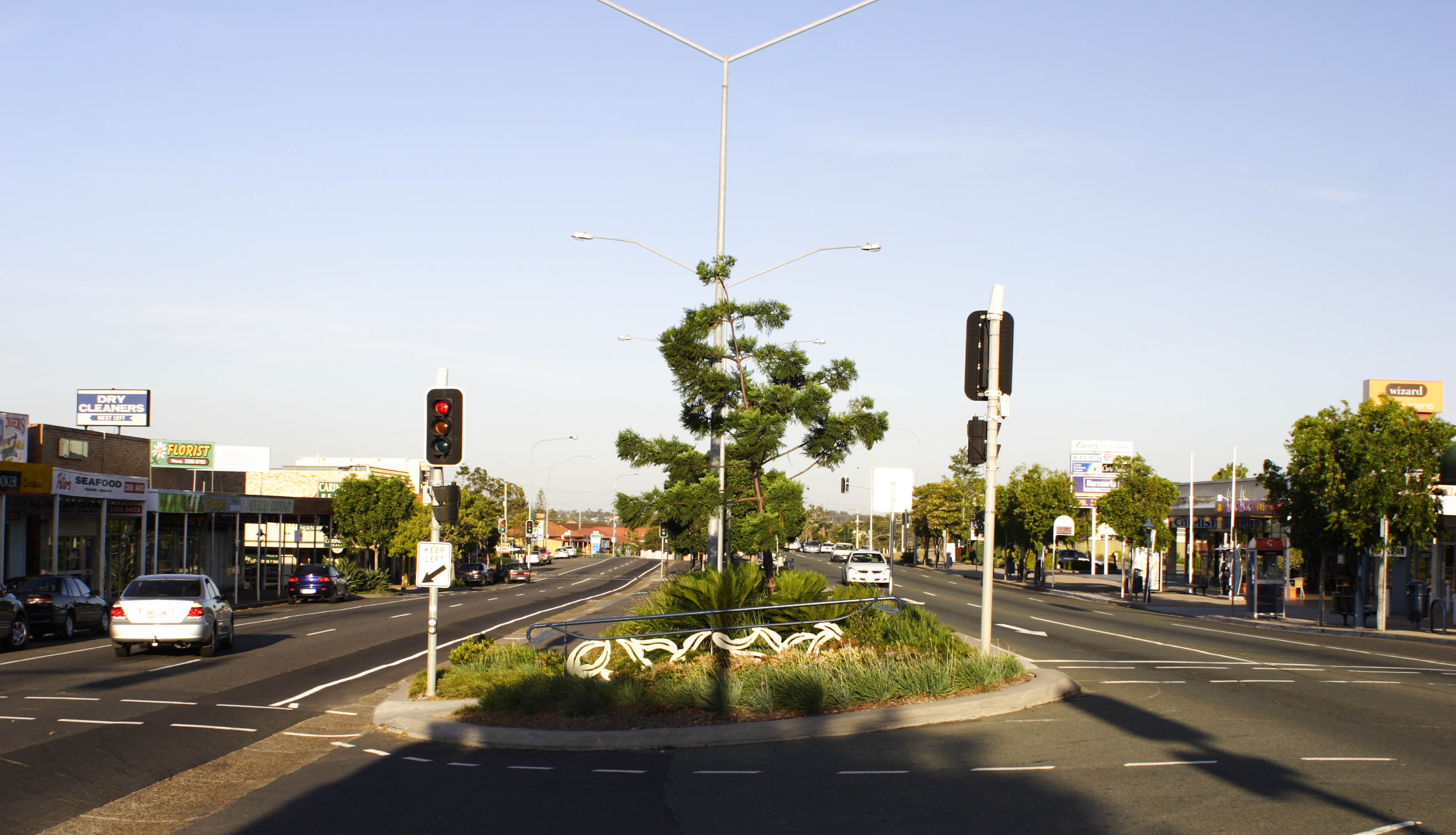
- Old Cleveland Road in Carina

- Interactive map of Carina
- Coordinates: 27.4858°S 153.1011°E
- Country: Australia
- State: Queensland
- City: Brisbane
- LGA: City of Brisbane (Doboy Ward)
- Location: 10.6 km (6.6 mi) E of Brisbane CBD

Government
  - State electorates: Bulimba; Chatsworth
  - Federal divisions: Bonner; Griffith

Area
  - Total: 4.5 km^{2} (1.7 sq mi)

Population
  - Total: 11,678 (2021 census)
  - Density: 2,595/km^{2} (6,720/sq mi)
- Time zone: UTC+10:00 (AEST)
- Postcode: 4152
Suburbs around Carina
| Cannon Hill | Cannon Hill | Tingalpa |
| Seven Hills | Carina | Tingalpa |
| Camp Hill | Carina Heights | Carindale |

Carina is an eastern suburb in the City of Brisbane, Queensland, Australia. In the 2021 census, Carina had a population of 11,678 people.

== Geography ==
Carina is located 7 kilometres (4.3 mi) east of the CBD, and borders Carindale, Carina Heights, Cannon Hill and Camp Hill.

Carina is a mostly residential suburb.

== History ==
Carina was originally inhabited by Murris; most likely the Jagera.

The area was first settled by Europeans in the 1850s, with the land mainly used for farming and timber-getting. The suburb takes its name from an estate on Creek Road constructed in the 1850s. The property belonged to Ebenezer Thorne, and was itself named after Thorne's daughter Kate Carina.

Growth occurred during the 1880s and early 1900s, when it was the main place of settlement in the Shire of Belmont.

In May 1889, (on what was then known as Coorparoo), 275 subdivided allotments of "Stanley Street Extended Estate" were advertised to be auctioned by James R. Dickson & Company. A map advertising the auction mentions free waggonettes from the Mart.

Carina State School opened on 30 January 1917. It is now within the suburb boundaries of Carindale.

The area remained mostly rural until after World War II, after which the construction of public housing contributed to a rapid population increase in the 1950s and 1960s.

One of the public housing projects in 1952 involved the use of prefabricated houses from Italy. Unfortunately one of the shipments was found to have infestations of the Sirex noctilio and all the timber on board had to be sprayed and fumigated before it could be used.

Between 1954 and 1969 the suburb was served by trolleybuses operated by the Brisbane City Council, which ran along Stanley Road, terminating at the intersection of Creek Road. Trams ran along Old Cleveland Road with the service terminating at Carina.

In November 1948, Archbishop James Duhig purchased a poultry farm as the site for a church and parish school. The parish was originally called "Our Lady of Graces and Blessed Martin de Porres, Belmont" but now the parish is known simply as Our Lady of Graces Parish while St Martin's Catholic Primary School is named after St Martin de Porres. The school opened on 25 January 1954.

Mayfield State School opened on 27 August 1956.

The Carina Library opened in 1966 with a major refurbishment in 2016.

St Otteran's Catholic School opened in 1959 and closed in 1978.

St Munchin's Infant School opened on 30 April 1961 and closed in 1978.

San Sisto College was established in 1961 by the Dominican Sisters with an initial enrolment of nine girls with teachers Sister Josephine, Sister Callista and Sister Jude. The school initiated operated at St Martin's School until the new convent was constructed in November 1961, allowing the school to operate from the old convent building. In 1963 construction commenced on purpose-built classrooms which opened in April 1964.

St Pauls Catholic Primary School closed in 1979.

Carina Police Station opened on 16 December 2011, the day after the closure of Camp Hill Police Station on 15 December 2011.

== Demographics ==
In the 2011 census, Carina had a population of 10,301 people, of whom 52.7% were female and 47.3% were male. The median age of the population was 34; 3 years younger than the Australian average of 37. 71.6% of people living in Carina were born in Australia, with the next most common countries of birth being New Zealand (4.8%), England (3.3%), India (1.3%), South Africa (0.9%), and the Philippines (0.7%). 81.4% of people spoke English as their first language, while the other most common responses were Spanish (1.3%), Cantonese (1%), Italian (0.9%), Mandarin (0.8%), and Greek (0.6%).

In the 2016 census, Carina had a population of 11,019 people, of whom 53.0% were female and 47.0% were male. The median age of the population was 36; 2 years younger than the Australian average of 38. 71.0% of people living in Carina were born in Australia, with the next most common countries of birth being New Zealand (3.9%), England (3.4%), India (2.1%), China (1.2%), and Ireland (0.9%). 80.7% of people spoke English as their first language, while the other most common responses were Spanish (1.5%), Mandarin (1.5%), Italian (1.0%), Cantonese (0.8%), and Punjabi (0.7%).

In the 2021 census, Carina had a population of 11,678 people, of whom 53.6% were female and 46.4% were male. The median age of the population was 37; 1 year younger than the Australian average of 38. 72.9% of people living in Carina were born in Australia, with the next most common countries of birth being New Zealand (3.9%), England (3.4%), India (1.4%), China (1.0%), and South Africa (0.8%). 81.6% of people spoke English as their first language, while the other most common responses were Spanish (1.8%), Mandarin (1.4%), Italian (0.9%), Korean (0.9), and Cantonese (0.7%).

== Heritage listings ==
Carina has the following heritage-listed sites:

- Flint's Cottage, 40 Lunga Street
- Old Cleveland Road Tramway Tracks, Old Cleveland Road (27.4955°S 153.0863°E)

== Education ==
Mayfield State School is a government primary (Prep-6) school for boys and girls at Paget Street (27.4839°S 153.0923°E). In 2016, the school had an enrolment of 315 students. In 2018, the school had an enrolment of 284 students with 20 teachers (17 full-time equivalent) and 16 non-teaching staff (10 full-time equivalent).

St Martin's School is a Catholic primary (Prep-6) school for boys and girls at 66 Broadway Street (27.4915°S 153.0899°E). In 2018, the school had an enrolment of 716 students with 45 teachers (39 full-time equivalent) and 24 non-teaching staff (14 full-time equivalent).

San Sisto College is a Catholic secondary (7-12) school for girls at 97 Mayfield Road (27.4906°S 153.0904°E). In 2018, the school had an enrolment of 714 students with 55 teachers (53 full-time equivalent) and 32 non-teaching staff (22 full-time equivalent).

There is no government secondary school in Carina. The nearest government secondary school is Whites Hill State College in neighbouring Camp Hill to the south-west.

== Facilities ==
A Brisbane City Council bus depot is situated on Creek Road Carina.

== Amenities ==
The Brisbane City Council operates a public library at 41 Mayfield Road. The library facility opened in 1966, and has publicly accessible Wi-Fi.

The Clem Jones Centre (a large sporting complex) is located in Zahel Street.

Carina has a soccer club called AC Carina. The main team plays in Vilic Law Capital League 1 and the main women's team plays in the Brisbane Women's Premier League.

The suburb is home to the Carina Tigers Rugby League Football Club.

== Transport ==
There has been no railway station in Carina since the closure of the Belmont Tramway in 1926. However, the suburb is served effectively by three radial bus corridors; Richmond Road along its northern border, Meadowlands Road-Stanley Road centrally, and Old Cleveland Road along its southern border. Richmond East is an express bus stop on Richmond Road that is serviced relatively frequently by two alternating, direct routes between Cannon Hill bus station and Brisbane's central business district. Numerous stops on Stanley Road are serviced relatively frequently by two alternating, direct all-stops routes between Fortitude Valley, and Cannon Hill bus station and Carindale bus station respectively. These routes largely follow the corridor of the former trolleybus routes that closed in 1969. A peak period limited-stops route also services Stanley Road. Old Cleveland Road has numerous stops, the most significant being Carina bus stop at Carina's shopping precinct, which is serviced by a regular all-stops route that largely follows the corridor of the former tram route that closed in 1969, along with two alternating, high frequency express routes that travel between Brisbane's central business district and Carindale, and an express route that travels between The University of Queensland and Carindale bus station. Additional peak-only routes service Old Cleveland Road.

Carina is also serviced by three limited-stops bus routes along the Creek Road corridor, which strategically connect key metropolitan centres across Brisbane including Carindale shopping centre and Cannon Hill shopping centre. These routes service Meadowlands, Carina Depot, Carina North, and Old Stockyards express stops. One route operates frequently, seven days per week between Brisbane's north east and south east suburbs. The other two operate less frequently and not at all on Sunday, but circumnavigate Brisbane's outer suburbs, one clockwise and the other anti-clockwise.

The suburb straddles TransLink Zones 2 and 3 from west to east. The western portion of the suburb is marginally more attractive to city commuters with respect to relatively cost effective transit travel.

Carina's terrain varies from flat on the Bulimba Creek floodplain in the suburb's east, to hilly in the suburb's west towards Seven Hills and Camp Hill. Traffic conditions are busy along its major roads including Old Cleveland Road, Meadowlands Road and Stanley Road, Richmond Road, and Creek Road. Recreational cycling opportunities are consequently limited on the west side of the suburb. However, the presence of Minnippi Park parkland including the Bulimba Creek Cycleway provides for good opportunities on its east side. As at February 2016 several citywide, on-road cycle routes pass through Carina. Old Cleveland Road is a radial route that includes intermittent, formal bicycle lanes. Meadowlands Road is a radial route that contains paved shoulders that serve as informal cycle lanes, while Stanley Road is line-marked as a Bicycle Awareness Zone (yellow stencil stylized bicycle marked on edge of vehicle travel lane). Richmond road contains a formal bicycle lane westbound and a Bicycle Awareness Zone eastbound, while parts of Creek Road have paved shoulders that serve as informal cycle lanes. Packs of cyclists are commonplace along Old Cleveland Road early on weekend mornings.

The hilly terrain in the suburb's west side and busy traffic conditions also impose some impediment to local walking opportunities. However, the grid structure of the road and street network and the presence of urban borders (verges) on almost all roadways promote relatively direct and safe walking conditions. The higher order local streets and the major roads mostly have paved footpaths on one or both sides. The major roads contain numerous signalised intersections with pedestrian control, which are typically located adjacent to bus stops. Refuge islands support safe crossing of certain other roads and streets. In addition to local pocket parks, nearby recreational walking attractions include Seven Hills Bushland Reserve to the northwest, and Meadowlands Picnic Ground and Minnippi Park parkland in the suburb's east.

== See also ==
- List of Brisbane suburbs
