= Belmont, Queensland =

Belmont
- Suburb
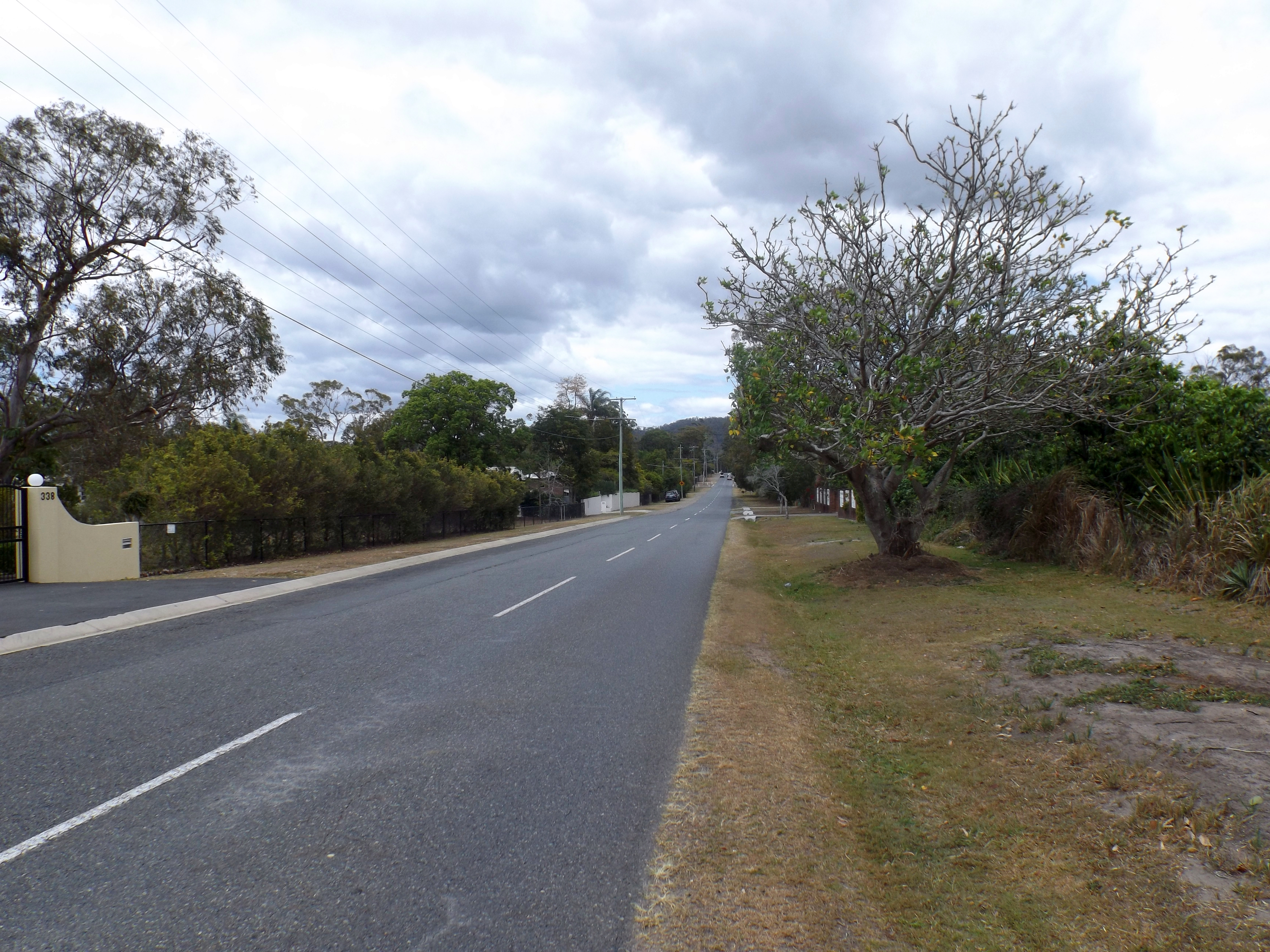
- Stanbrough Road, 2014

- Interactive map of Belmont
- Coordinates: 27.5058°S 153.1352°E
- Country: Australia
- State: Queensland
- City: Brisbane
- LGA: City of Brisbane (Chandler Ward; Doboy Ward)
- Location: 13.0 km (8.1 mi) ESE of Brisbane CBD
- Established: 1894

Government
  - State electorate: Chatsworth
  - Federal division: Bonner

Area
  - Total: 10.0 km^{2} (3.9 sq mi)

Population
  - Total: 4,498 (2021 census)
  - Density: 449.8/km^{2} (1,165/sq mi)
- Time zone: UTC+10:00 (AEST)
- Postcode: 4153
Suburbs around Belmont
Carina	Tingalpa	Wakerley
Carindale	Belmont	Gumdale
Carindale	Mackenzie	Chandler

Belmont is an outer suburb in the City of Brisbane, Queensland, Australia. In the 2021 census, Belmont had a population of 4,498 people.

== Geography ==
While much of the suburb remains as undeveloped blocks of bush mixed with large rural properties, some areas have built-up residential estates.

Two of Brisbane's main roads, the Gateway Motorway above and Old Cleveland Road underneath, cross at a large intersection in Belmont. Belmont has become an affluent suburb with large estates sitting on acres of land. Homes can range from around 3,500 square feet (330 m^{2}) to 10,000 square feet (930 m^{2}) and over.

Mount Petrie is in the south of the suburb (27.5249°S 153.1353°E) and rises to 169 metres (554 ft) above sea level.

== History ==
The local indigenous people hunted and camped within the creeks and hills of Belmont, both before and after white settlement of the area. A corroboree ground existed on banks of Bulimba Creek and mineral springs near Mount Petrie were a popular camping spot for the Aboriginal people.

Andrew Petrie had reported that fine timber existed in the area. Mount Petrie is named after him.

The suburb takes its name from Belmont House, built circa 1860 by Colonel August Bernecker. The name is derived from the French Bellemont meaning beautiful mountain. August Charles Frederick Bernecker gave the name Belmont to his new estate outside of Brisbane and this name spread to the rest of the area.

The hoop pine brought timber cutters to the area in the 1850s and by the 1860s and 1870s the cleared land near the creeks and the rich soils from the cleared forests were used to grow sugar cane. As sugar production declined in southern Queensland, farmers moved to growing pineapples, bananas and small crops including tomatoes, potatoes and grapes. Dairies and fodder farms were also located in the area.

Belmont State School opened on 5 June 1876. It is now within the suburb boundaries of Carindale. San Sisto Secondary College opened in Belmont on 1 February 1961; it is now within the suburb boundaries of Carina

The Grassdale Land Company Limited formed on 8 January 1885 to acquire the property known as Grassdale Paddocks, in the parish of Tingalpa, with registered shareholders holding 80 shares of 250 pounds each. This area is spread across the Brisbane suburbs of Belmont, Chandler and Gumdale. The company offered the land for auction in the Grassdale Estate later in 1885. The allotments were situated along Grassdale Road, London Road, Boston Road, Old Cleveland Road, Archer Street and four unnamed roads (later called Belmont Road, Stanborough Road, Tilley Road and New Cleveland Road). Prior to the sale extensive publicity was published in the Brisbane newspapers, calling for "the attention of the investor, capitalist, farmer, merchant, artizan [sic], and mechanic, and is only one hour's drive from Brisbane, and as it has been decided to run the Cleveland Railway through the Estate, it will be brought within a few minutes' ride of the heart of the city". The results of the public auction on 28 November 1885 were reported in the Telegraph newspaper with "forty-two lots were disposed of, comprising an area of 144 acres..." The Grassdale Land Company Limited later produced a plan of divisions of unsold land into 45 lots, listing the size and value of the lots at the time.

The local government area Belmont Division was split from the Bulimba Division in 1894 and by 1901 this became the Belmont Shire. Belmont Shire was a larger area than Belmont today with parts now included in the suburb of Carindale and other suburbs.

From 25 May 1912, the Belmont Shire Council operated the Belmont Tramway, a 3 feet 6 inches (1.07 m) gauge steam tramway from Norman Park railway station to a terminus near the present State School. The line closed following the amalgamation of Shire into the City of Greater Brisbane in 1925, briefly re-opening for a short period in 1926.

In August 1948, the Belmont tram line extension was opened.

== Demographics ==
In the 2011 census, Belmont recorded a population of 4,594 people. The population was 50.5% female and 49.5% male.The median age of the Belmont population was 38 years of age. 72.6% of people living in Belmont were born in Australia, compared to the national average of 66.7%; the next most common countries of birth were New Zealand 5.2%, England 2.9%, China 1.7%, South Africa 1.3%, India 1.2%. 79.7% of people spoke only English at home; the next most popular languages were 2.3% Mandarin, 1.7% Greek, 1.4% Spanish, 1.2% Cantonese, 1.1% Italian.

In the 2016 census, Belmont had a population of 4,374 people.

In the 2021 census, Belmont had a population of 4,498 people.

== Education ==
There are no schools within Belmont. Despite the name, Belmont State School is now within the current boundaries of Carindale.

The nearest government primary schools are Tingalpa State School in neighbouring Tingalpa to the north, Gumdale State School in neighbouring Gumdale to the north-east and Belmont State School in neighbouring Carindale to the west. The nearest government secondary schools are Brisbane Bayside State College in Wynnum West to the north-east, Whites Hill State College in Camp Hill to the west, and Mansfield State High School in Mansfield to the south-west.

== Amenities ==
The Belmont Rifle Range (27.5103°S 153.1335°E) hosts a number of sport shooting clubs. It was the venue for shooting events for the 1982 Commonwealth Games and 2018 Commonwealth Games, and site of the 2011 World Long Range Championships. To the south of the rifle range is Mount Petrie.

=== Parks ===
There are a number of parks in the suburb, including:

- Belmont Hills Bushland (27.5073°S 153.1224°E)
- Cassandra Crescent Park (27.4800°S 153.1199°E)
- Coventry Circuit Park (27.5288°S 153.1226°E)
- Dairy Swamp Road Park (27.4860°S 153.1366°E)
- Glenavon Street Park (27.4871°S 153.1223°E)
- Iona Close Park (27.4832°S 153.1227°E)
- Kianawah Park (27.4805°S 153.1242°E)
- Meadowlands Picnic Ground Park (27.4903°S 153.1218°E)
- Mt Petrie Road Park (no.386) (27.5340°S 153.1290°E)
- Pinnacle Place Park (27.4842°S 153.1251°E)
- She-oak Park (27.4853°S 153.1282°E)
- Summit Street Park (27.4898°S 153.1300°E)
- Thredbo Place Park (27.4884°S 153.1333°E)
- Tilley Road (no 727) Park (27.5176°S 153.1484°E)
- Wright Street Park (27.4943°S 153.1229°E)

== See also ==
- List of tramways in Queensland
