= Cannon Hill station =

Cannon Hill station may refer to:

- Cannon Hill railway station, Queensland, Australia
- Cannon Hill bus station, Queensland, Australia
- Cannon Hill tube station, London, England
