= Camp Hill, Queensland =

Camp Hill
- Suburb
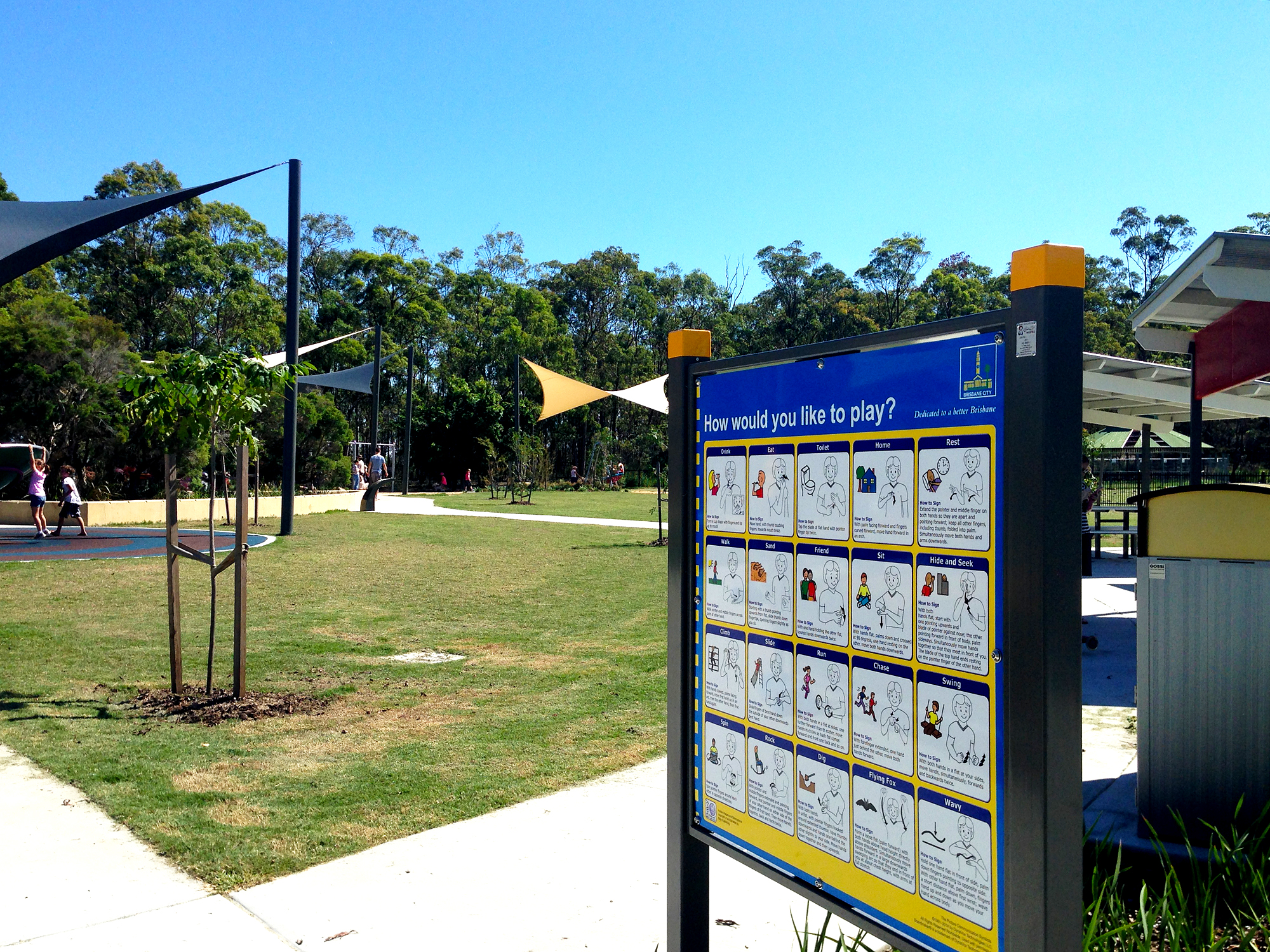
- Playground in Whites Hill Reserve, Camp Hill

- Interactive map of Camp Hill
- Coordinates: 27.5°S 153.0791°E
- Country: Australia
- State: Queensland
- City: Brisbane
- LGA: City of Brisbane (Coorparoo Ward and Morningside Ward)
- Location: 8.1 km (5.0 mi) SE of Brisbane CBD

Government
  - State electorates: Chatsworth; Greenslopes; Bulimba
  - Federal division: Griffith

Area
  - Total: 4.8 km^{2} (1.9 sq mi)

Population
  - Total: 12,254 (2021 census)
  - Density: 2,553/km^{2} (6,610/sq mi)
- Time zone: UTC+10:00 (AEST)
- Postcode: 4152
Suburbs around Camp Hill
Norman Park	Seven Hills	Carina
Coorparoo	Camp Hill	Carina
Coorparoo	Holland Park	Carina Heights

Camp Hill is a suburb in the City of Brisbane, Queensland, Australia. In the 2021 census, Camp Hill had a population of 12,254 people.

== History ==
Camp Hill was originally known as Schick's Hill, named for one the area's earliest settlers, Peter Schick. Schick along with Kasper Klüpfel purchased the land now bordered by Old Cleveland Road, Bennett's Road, Lloyd and Pampling Street on 21 May 1859. This property bordered (or was within or nearby) the area known as Four-mile Camp, where drovers and other travellers rested on the journey to Cleveland due to the abundance of forage and permanent water holes. The camp may have been located near the site of the Coorparoo State School. Eventually complaints over the steep climb and poor roads in the area led to public works being undertaken on Mr Schick's land on what was called "the Four Mile Camp Hill". This was eventually shortened to Camp Hill, with no more references to 'Schick's Hill' after the 1890s.

Another theory is that Camp Hill is named for teamsters who camped at a waterhole near Whites Hill in the suburb's south, while travelling between Brisbane and Cleveland.

Originally, settlers in the area were farmers, with a strong German influence in the community in the early period. In the 1860s, McCann's Greenbank Dairy was in operation, and Peter Faust was also farming in that era.

The "Ravensburn Estate", comprising blocks of land now bordered by Old Cleveland Road, Raven Street, Koondara Street and Renton Street, was advertised to be auctioned by R.J. Cottell on 13 August 1887. A map advertising the auction notes that the land was close to Coorparoo School and Stanley Bridge.

In May 1887, in the area now bounded by Old Cleveland Road, Fergusons Road and Stanley Road, 332 allotments, called the "East Coorparoo Estate" were advertised for private sale by A. McNish Fraser. A map advertising the allotments for sale shows the allotments in Clara Street and Margaret Street, as well as streets that were called George, William and Edward Streets.

Between 1912 and 1926 the suburb was serviced by the Belmont Tramway, which was a steam tram service that connected with the Queensland Government Railway owned and operated Cleveland railway line at Norman Park. Initially the service was operated by the Belmont Shire Council. The service was suspended in 1924. The service was reinstated by the Brisbane City Council in 1925, but was again suspended in 1926. The line branched from the Cleveland line where Acfold Street (in Norman Park) now ends. It then crossed Bennetts Road (Belmont Junction station) and followed a corridor that now contains Bennett's Bushland Park, D'arcy Road, Oateson Skyline Drive (in Seven Hills, including Seven Hills station), Camp Hill Bowls Club (Mt Bruce Station), residences between Perth Street and Stephen Street, the Camp Hill State Infants and Primary School large oval, residences alongside Little Ferguson Road (City View Station) then between Margaret Street and Arrol Street, where it joined Old Cleveland Road.

In August 1914, "Mount Bruce Railway Station Estate", made up of over 200 blocks, was advertised to be auctioned by C.A. Gordon. A map advertising the auction shows the blocks in the area bordered by Old Cleveland Road, Wiles Street, Perth Street and Pampling Street. It shows the estate was "at Mt Bruce Railway Station, and within a few minutes walk of Norman Park Railway Station, where 20 trains pass daily".

In October 1916, in the area now between Martha Street and Waverley Road, 174 sites of the "Coorparoo Heights" estate were advertised to be auctioned by Cameron Bros. A map advertising the auction states that the land was "within easy walking distance of the tram terminus."

In 1916, Matilda Margaret Maloney (the sister of Thomas Joseph Byrnes who was the first Catholic Premier of Queensland) sold James Duhig (Catholic Archbishop of Brisbane) 22 acres (8.9 ha) of land in the area then known as East Coorparoo (now Camp Hill), which had formerly been owned by her late brother Thomas Byrnes. Duhig sold most of the land, but retained some for a church and school. On Sunday 11 February 1923 Duhig officially dedicated St Thomas's Catholic Church, a wooden building of approximately 9 by 19 metres (30 ft × 62 ft). Following her death in 1922, Maloney's will provided a donation in memory of her brother of £300 towards the £850 cost of the building. Duhig decided the church should be named after Saint Thomas and that it would also be a memorial for Thomas Byrnes.

"The Pride of Coorparoo" estate, made up of allotments in the area bordered by Old Cleveland Road, Boundary Road and Pryde Street, was advertised for auction by Cameron Bros on 16 June 1917. A map advertising the auction shows the nearby City View Station on the Belmont Railway.

Lossock Avenue and Tranters Avenue share an interesting history: William Lossock, owner and proprietor of Tranters Hotel in London, met the Brisbane architect who was subdividing land in the Camp Hill area when he visited London in the early 1920s. They became friends and the architect promised to name a street in the new estate after him, as well as one after the name of the hotel. Other local street names include Hobart, Sydney and Melbourne Avenue, which are the names of World War I ships as well as Australian capital cities.

The "Oberthur Estate", comprising "21 building blocks and 3 market garden or small dairy blocks", was advertised to be auctioned by Blocksidge & Ferguson Limited on 16 June 1923. A map advertising the auction shows the lots on Ashton Street.

In September 1925, the "Mount Bruce Homesites" were advertised for private sale by J. Moody and S.E. Costin. The land comprised 60 homesites in the area bounded by Old Cleveland Road, Theodore Avenue (now Wiles Street), Perth Street and New Road (now Pampling Street).

On 10 October 1925, "Camp Hill Terminus Estate, Coorparoo" made up of 14 allotments of land, was advertised to be auctioned by Charlton, Elliot and Sons. A map advertising the auction shows the blocks of land between Old Cleveland Road and Donald Street, bordered by what it now Pampling Street.

In 1925, Daly Estate was advertised for sale by Marcus F. Lyons & Winning. A map and aerial photograph of Daly Estate shows allotments in the area between Old Cleveland Road and Martha Street.

On Saturday 10 January 1925, the tram line extension from Coorparoo to Camp Hill was officially opened. The extension was 1.25 miles (2.01 km).

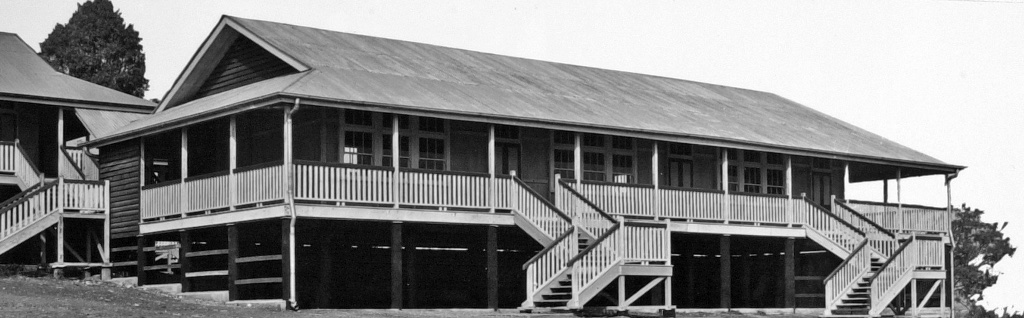
Camp Hill State School, 1947

Mount Bruce State School opened on 1 July 1926 with an official opening on 3 July 1926 by the Minister for Education Thomas Wilson. It was renamed Camp Hill State School in 1931. On 1 January 2007, it merged with Camp Hill Infants State School to become Camp Hill Infants and Primary School.

On 2 May 1926, the Anglican Church of the Annunciation at 101 Watson Street was dedicated as a Church Mission. The building was the former St Andrew's Anglican Church at Roadvale, which was dedicated on 11 May 1912 by Venerable Henry Le Fanu, the Archdeacon of Toowoomba. In 1926, the church in Roadvale closed and the building was relocated to Camp Hill. In 1940 the church was extended. In 1975 it was rebuilt but still retained the original structure, re-opening on 24 October 1975.

In February 1928, the local Methodists decided to build a Sunday school with a church to be built later. They purchased land at 626 Old Cleveland Road (27.4926°S 153.0765°E) for £400. In April 1928 they purchased a disused storage building in Norman Park from the Brisbane City Council for £25 and relocated it to the Old Cleveland Road site. The local Methodist minister, Albert Taylor, was a former carpenter. Assisted by volunteer labour and donation of window glass from Methodist contractor Walter Taylor, Albert Taylor modified the building to be suitable for use as a Sunday school and a church. Albert Taylor also made the church furniture. By the 1950s a larger church was needed. In 1955 the old church was relocated to the rear of the site and in 1958 Reverend Potter laid the foundation stone for the new brick church at the front of the site. The new church cost £18,500. Following the amalgamation that created the Uniting Church in Australia, in 1978 the church became the Camp Hill Uniting Church. The site was sold in 2013 for $2,414,087. The church was demolished in 2016.

St Thomas' Catholic School opened on 28 January 1929 when two Sisters of the Good Samaritan began teaching 84 children on the three verandahs that had been added to the church. In January 1937 the school moved into a two-storey brick building.

The Belmont Tramway line remained in place until 1934, by which time the Brisbane City Council had extended its electric tramway from Coorparoo further along Old Cleveland Road, eventually becoming Route 06 between Fortitude Valley and Belmont (now Carina). Route 06 was replaced by a bus service when electric trams ceased operations in April 1969. As at 2016 Brisbane City Council's Route 204 still largely follows the former BCC Tram Route 06 along Old Cleveland Road, while Route 212 largely follows the former Belmont Tramway, although it travels to Carindale via Stanley Road rather than Old Cleveland Road. Although most of the tram tracks have been removed, one section of approximately 625 metres (2,051 ft) remains and is heritage-listed. Should the Eastern Busway be extended to Carindale, it is possible that these tracks may be removed despite the heritage listing.

Camp Hill Police Station opened in 1938 at 580 Old Cleveland Road (27.4923°S 153.0742°E). It closed on 15 December 2011 to be replaced by the Carina Police Station which opened on 16 December 2011.

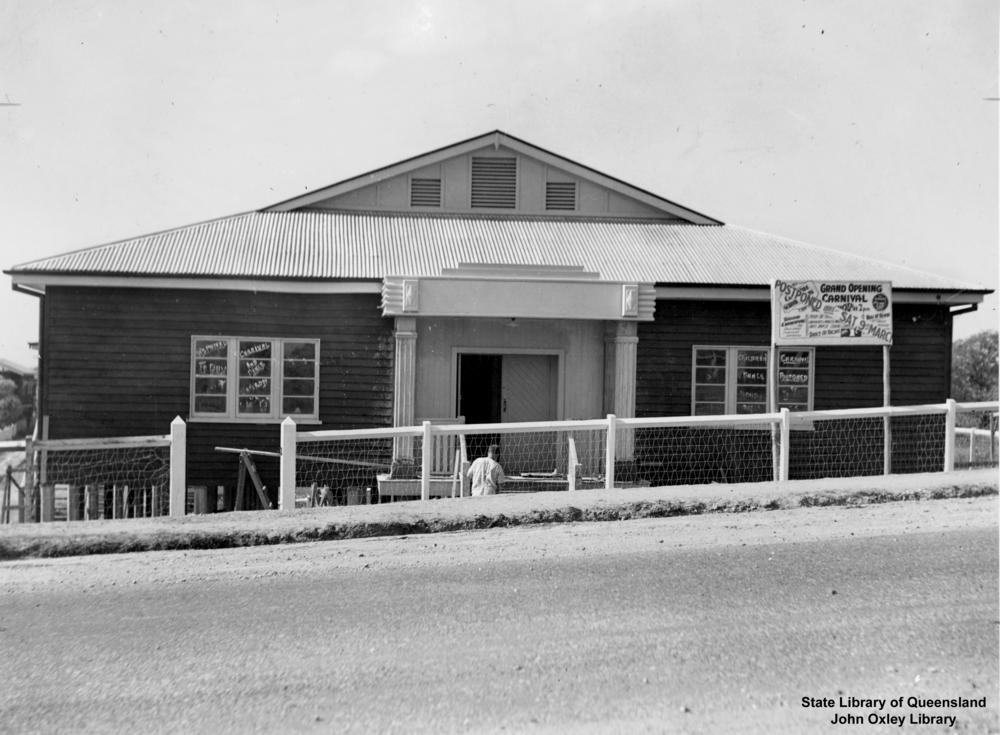
School of Arts hall at Camp Hill, 1940

On Saturday 9 March 1940 the Camp Hill School of Arts was officially opened by the Brisbane Lord Mayor Alfred James Jones, having had its original planned opening on Saturday 2 March postponed due to rain. Located on the corner of Old Cleveland Road and Theodore Avenue (now Wiles Street) near the tram terminus, the wooden building was 92 by 52 feet (28 by 16 m) and was designed by James Arundel and built by the Wells Brothers for £1,236/10/-. The hall had a dance floor, stage, library and supper room.

The US Army had a significant impact on the area during World War II. A large US hospital was built on land to the rear of the Camp Hill Hotel. It accommodated up to 3,000 patients and staff. Now Arrol, Errey, Ascham, Morven, Aubrey and Arrowsmith Streets take up the site. These street follow the same pattern as the US constructed hospital roads. Also during World War II, the Australian Army used White's Hill as an observation site.

Camp Hill State Infants School opened on 30 January 1951. On 1 January 2007 it merged with Camp Hill Infants State School to become Camp Hill Infants and Primary School. The infants school was at 45 Wiles Street (immediately adjacent to Camp Hill State School, 27.4913°S 153.0786°E). The infant school's website was archived.

On 17 October 1954, despite the drizzling rain, the Regina Caeli Catholic Church was dedicated by Archbishop Duhig to Our Lady, Queen of Heaven. The Archdiocese purchased the land in 1935 but construction of the church did not commence until 1953. Father Cyril Shand was its first priest who conducted services in an army marquee until the church was completed.

On Sunday 5 September 1954, the Camp Hill Presbyterian Church was officially dedicated by the Moderator, the Right Reverend Rowellyn Ramsay, at 535 Old Cleveland Road (27.4928°S 153.0739°E). The congregation began in 1944, meeting in the School of Arts with services conducted by Reverend Andrew Cuthbertson Kennedy from Coorparoo. In 1945 they acquired the site on Old Cleveland Road and relocated an old army hut to serve as a temporary church. The brick church cost £9000 and the army hut then become the Sunday School. The church was still operating at 1990 as part of the Presbyterian Church of Queensland (that is, it did not participate in the amalgamation that created the Uniting Church in Australia in 1977), but subsequently closed. The property was sold in 2001 for $450,000. As at 2021, the church building is now used as a Buddhist centre.

The Church of Jesus Christ of Latter Day Saints opened in 1956.

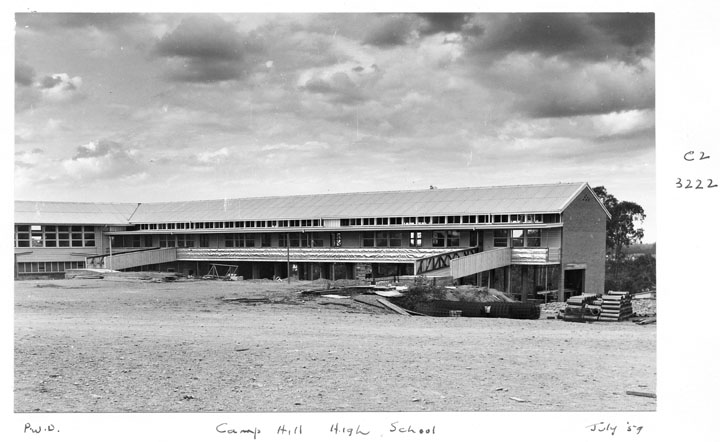
Camp Hill State High School, July 1959

Camp Hill State High School opened on 4 February 1957. It was on the northeast corner of Burn Street and Samuel Street (27.5016°S 153.0826°E).

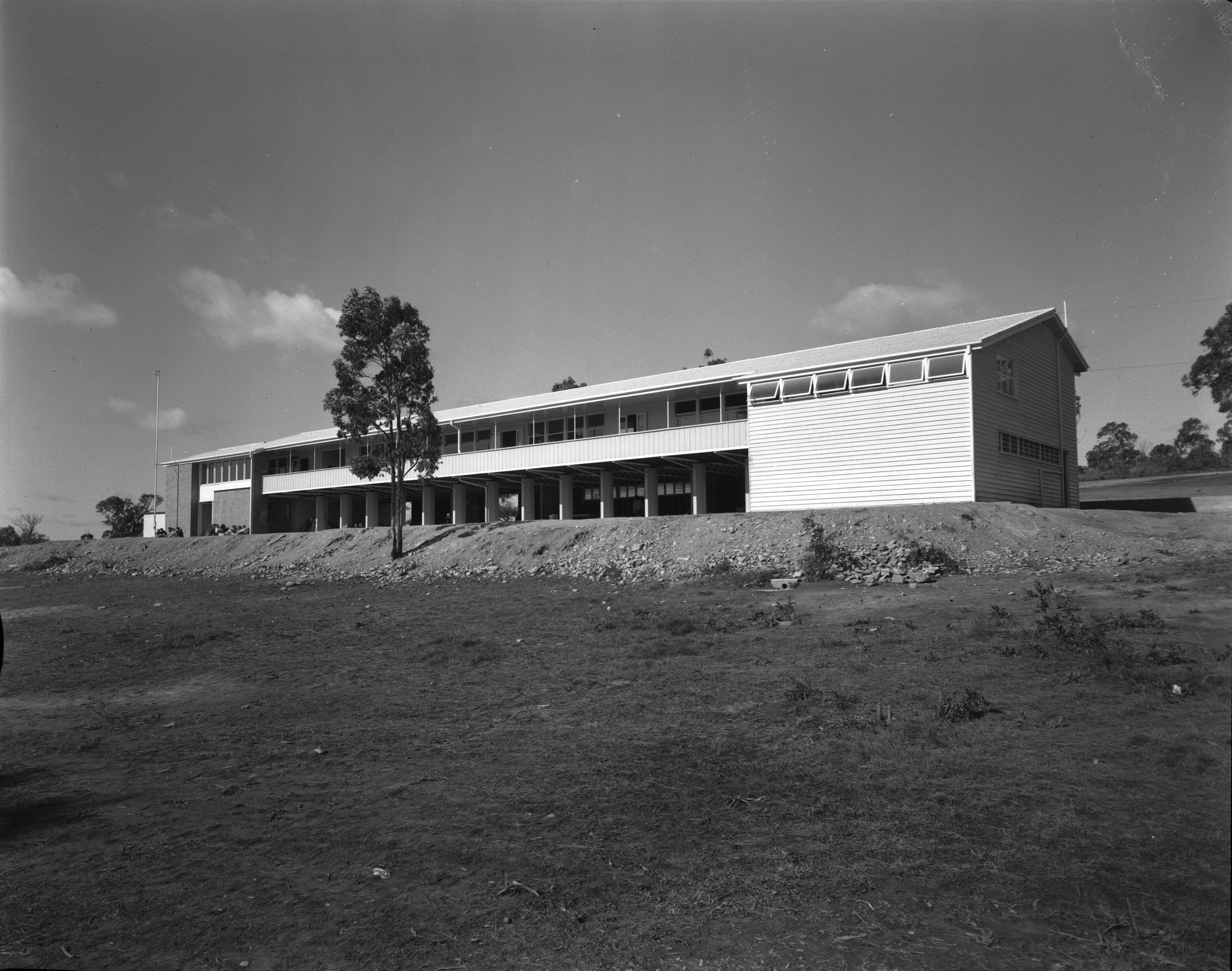
Whites Hill State School, Camp Hill, 1958

Whites Hill State School opened on 8 June 1958. It was on the south-east corner of Burn Street and Abbott Street (27.4997°S 153.0834°E).

In November 1957, Archbishop Duhig blessed the foundation stone for a new brick St Thomas the Apostle Catholic and then officially opened it in October 1958. This is the current church building.

During the 1960s, Brisbane City Council also operated an electric trolleybus line along the Macrossan Avenue-Stanley Road corridor with a branch line along Oateson Skyline Drive. Trolleybuses were replaced by conventional diesel buses coinciding with the closure of the city's electric tram system in 1969.

Between at least 1975 and 1990, Majestic Park Baptist Church was at 109 Waverley Road (27.4999°S 153.0751°E). As at 2021, the church building has been demolished/removed and a modern commercial building erected.

Between at least 1975 and 1990, Calvary Lutheran Church was at 75-77 Cambridge Street (27.5002°S 153.0862°E). As at 2021, the church building has been demolished/removed and a modern house erected.

Between at least 1975 and 1990, Camp Hill Church of Christ was at 22 Third Street (27.4958°S 153.0814°E). As at 2021, the church building has been demolished/removed and a modern house erected.

By 1975, the Kingdom Hall of Jehovah's Witnesses had been established at 456 Old Cleveland Road (27.4916°S 153.0667°E). In late 2019 the building was taken over by the Ahmadiyya Muslim Community to establish a mosque.

In 2002, Camp Hill State High School merged with adjacent Whites Hill State School and Xavier Special School (in Coorparoo) to create Whites Hill State College which operated from the same sites as the former Camp Hill State High School and Whites Hill State School. Despite the merger, the Xavier Special Education Unit of the new college was never relocated to the Camp Hill site but remained in Coorparoo until the end of 2009 when the lease expired on the Coorparoo site, after which it was transferred to Mount Gravatt West Special School (now Nursery Road Special School in Holland Park West).

== Geography ==
Camp Hill is 6 kilometres (3.7 mi) south-east of the CBD. It is a mostly residential suburb.

Camp Hill has the following mountains:

- Esquiline Hill (27.4826°S 153.0815°E)
- Sankeys Mountain (27.5076°S 153.0827°E)
- Whites Hill (27.5059°S 153.0784°E) 112 metres (367 ft) above sea level

== Demographics ==
In the 2016 census, Camp Hill had a population of 11,202 people. 78.0% of people were born in Australia. The next most common countries of birth were England 3.2%, New Zealand 3.0%, India 1.0%. 85.3% of people spoke only English at home. Other languages spoken at home included Greek 1.1%, Italian 1.0% The most common responses for religion were Catholic 32.7%, No Religion 28.1% and Anglican 12.9%.

In the 2021 census, Camp Hill had a population of 12,254 people. 80% of people were born in Australia. The next most common countries of birth were England (2.9%), New Zealand (2.7%) and South Africa (0.9%). 87% of people spoke only English at home. Other languages spoken at home included Mandarin (1.1%), Greek (1.1%), and Spanish (0.8%). The most common responses for religion were No Religion (39%), Catholic (29.1%) and Anglican (10.1%).

== Heritage listings ==
There are a number of heritage-listed sites in Camp Hill, including:

- Isleworth, 28 Ashton Street
- Forster's Dairy Cottage, 38 Ashton Street
- Yalcongreen, 109 Bennetts Road (corner with Watson Street
- White's Hill Reserve (also known as White's Hill Lookout), 226 Boundary Road
- Anzac Cottage (also known as TB Home), 17 Bovelles Street
- St Helens (also known as Rosefarm), 13 Ethel Street
- Parooba, 25 Lloyd Street
- Collins Residence, 46 Lloyd Street
- Old Cleveland Road Tramway Tracks, Old Cleveland Road
- Hitching post & seat, outside 594 Old Cleveland Road
- Duplex, 610 Old Cleveland Road, Camp Hill
- former Methodist Church Hall, 626 Old Cleveland Road
- Camp Hill School of Arts, 642 Old Cleveland Road
- Rockhampton House (also known as Coorparoo House), 86 Princess Street
- Wandoo (also known as Coorparoo House), 91 Princess Street
- Chase's Cottage, 17 Tarana Street
- Croyde, 84 Watson Street
- Eastholme, 89 Watson Street

== Education ==
Camp Hill State Infants and Primary School is a government primary (Prep–6) school for boys and girls at 676 Old Cleveland Road (27.4929°S 153.0785°E). In 2017, the school had an enrolment of 807 students with 68 teachers (52 full-time equivalent) and 46 non-teaching staff (23 full-time equivalent). It includes a special education program.

St Thomas' Catholic School is a Catholic primary (Prep–6) school for boys and girls at 10 Stephen Street (27.4871°S 153.0719°E). In 2017, the school had an enrolment of 330 students with 26 teachers (20 full-time equivalent) and 17 non-teaching staff (9 full-time equivalent).

Whites Hill State College is a government primary and secondary (Prep–12) school for boys and girls at 138 Burn Street (27.5006°S 153.0821°E). In 2017, the school had an enrolment of 765 students with 77 teachers (71 full-time equivalent) and 48 non-teaching staff (32 full-time equivalent). It includes a special education program.

== Facilities ==
Camp Hill Fire Station is at 112 Ferguson Road (27.4881°S 153.0785°E).

== Amenities ==
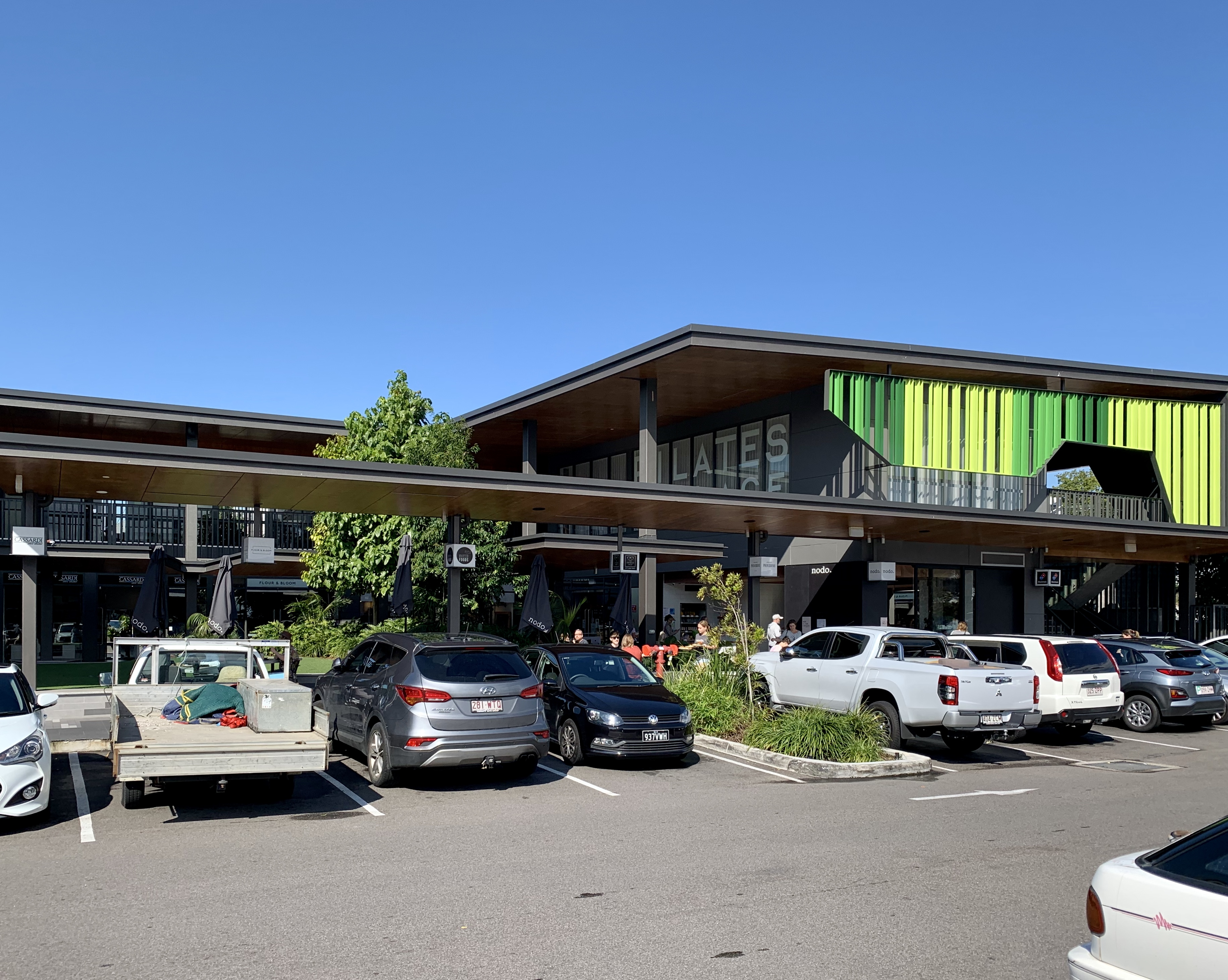
Camp Hill Marketplace, 2020

Shopping in Camp Hill centres on two areas. Camp Hill Marketplace at 25 Samuel Street (27.5009°S 153.0766°E) is anchored by a large Woolworths supermarket, supported by cafes, grocery stores and restaurants. The Old Cleveland Road section features a more eclectic selection of boutique shopping outlets and business, notably a large antiques store in the historic Planet Theatre Building and a HiFi Audio store. It also has a number of cafes and traditional local businesses. The backstreets of Camp Hill have a number of hidden boutique stores, cafes and restaurant, the largest district being along Martha Street.

The Camp Hill Hotel is a prominent traditional-style pub with accommodation at 724 Old Cleveland Road (27.4923°S 153.0830°E).

The Anglican Church of The Annunciation is at 101 Watson Street (27.4878°S 153.0689°E).

St Thomas the Apostle Catholic Church is at 31 Perth Street (27.4869°S 153.0729°E).

Regina Caeli Catholic Church is at 81 Waverley Road (27.4997°S 153.0733°E).

The Church of Jesus Christ of Latter Day Saints meets at 22 Sylvia Street (27.4929°S 153.0722°E).

The Langri Tangpa Buddhist Centre is at 535 Old Cleveland Road in the former Presbyterian church (27.4928°S 153.0739°E).

Mubarak Mosque is at 456 Old Cleveland Road in the former Kingdom Hall of Jehovah's Witnesses (27.4915°S 153.0666°E). It is operated by the Ahmadiyya Muslim Community.

Camp Hill School of Arts Hall is a public hall available for hire at 642 Old Cleveland Road (27.4929°S 153.0776°E).

Brisbane Metro Touch operate a touch football field in Whites Hill Reserve (27.5094°S 153.0787°E).

There are a number of parks in the suburb, including:

- Abbott Street Park (27.4997°S 153.0859°E)
- Bowie's Flat Park, includes an artificial lagoon that attracts a variety of birds and lizards (27.4943°S 153.0652°E)
- Burn Street Park (27.4955°S 153.0834°E)
- Garth Webb Park (27.4885°S 153.0861°E)
- Joe Foster Park (27.4934°S 153.0694°E)
- Lavarack Park near Stanley Road, features children's play equipment and a short walking loop (27.4898°S 153.0837°E)
- Leicester Street Park (27.4969°S 153.0673°E)
- Perth Street Park backing onto the Camp Hills Bowls Club, features play equipment, BBQ facilities and a fenced dog park (27.4861°S 153.0757°E)
- Seven Hills Bushland Reserve (27.4801°S 153.0853°E)
- Tarana Street Park (27.4951°S 153.0734°E)
- Wembley Park (27.4901°S 153.0635°E)
- Whites Hill Reserve, features a large modern children's play area, BBQ facilities, sports fields, and bushwalking tracks with native wildlife such as koalas and swamp wallabies (27.5082°S 153.0798°E)

There are numerous kindergartens and pre-schools dotted around the suburb. Additional amenities include numerous doctor's offices, dental surgeries and pharmacies located around the suburb.

With hilly terrain and busy traffic conditions in Camp Hill, local recreational cycling opportunities are limited, aside from paved circuits on Lavarack Park and Perth Street Park. However, as at February 2016 several citywide cycle routes pass through Camp Hill. Old Cleveland Road is a radial route that includes formal bicycle lanes in neighbouring suburbs of Carina and Coorparoo, although not through Camp Hill. Stanley Road is a radial route that is line-marked as a Bicycle Awareness Zone (yellow stencil stylized bicycle marked on edge of vehicle travel lane). Oateson Skyline Drive - Wiles St is a circumferential route that includes formal bicycle lanes. The inner eastern suburbs bicycle route, also circumferential, includes bicycle lanes on Bennetts Road and then passes through back streets marked as Bicycle Awareness Zones between Old Cleveland Road at Ashton Street, and Chatsworth Road at Greens Road. Packs of cyclists are commonplace along Old Cleveland Road early on weekend mornings.

The hilly terrain and busy traffic conditions also impose some impediment to local walking opportunities. However, the grid structure of the road and street network and the presence of urban borders (verges) on all roadways promote relatively direct and safe walking conditions. The higher order local streets and the major roads mostly have paved footpaths on one or both sides. Old Cleveland Road has four signalised intersections with pedestrian control, which are all located adjacent to bus stops. Refuge islands support safe crossing of other roads and streets. Aside from local parks, nearby recreational walking attractions include Seven Hills Bushland Reserve to the north of Camp Hill, and Whites Hill Recreational Reserve immediately to the south.

== Attractions ==
Whites Hill Lookout (27.5057°S 153.0782°E) is at the end of walking walk accessed from Whites Hill Reserve at 226 Boundary Road. It offers views over Brisbane.

== Transport ==
There has been no railway station in Camp Hill since the Belmont Tramway closed in 1926, however Coorparoo and Norman Park stations are located in neighbouring suburbs. Despite this, Camp Hill is well served by radial bus routes along the Old Cleveland Road, Stanley Road, and Chatsworth Rd corridors. Buses operate frequently and with a long span of service along Old Cleveland Road, between the Brisbane central business district and Carindale Shopping Centre bus station. The most significant stop is Camp Hill Stop 30 on Old Cleveland Road at Bruce Street, which is serviced by express, peak limited stops, and all-stops bus routes. Stop 30 is the site of the proposed Camp Hill busway station as part of the Eastern Busway planning. The suburb is situated within TransLink Zone 1, which makes it attractive to city commuters with respect to relatively cost effective transit travel.
