= Whites Hill =

Hill in Queensland, Australia

Coordinates: 27°30′37″S 153°04′58″E

Whites Hill Reserve
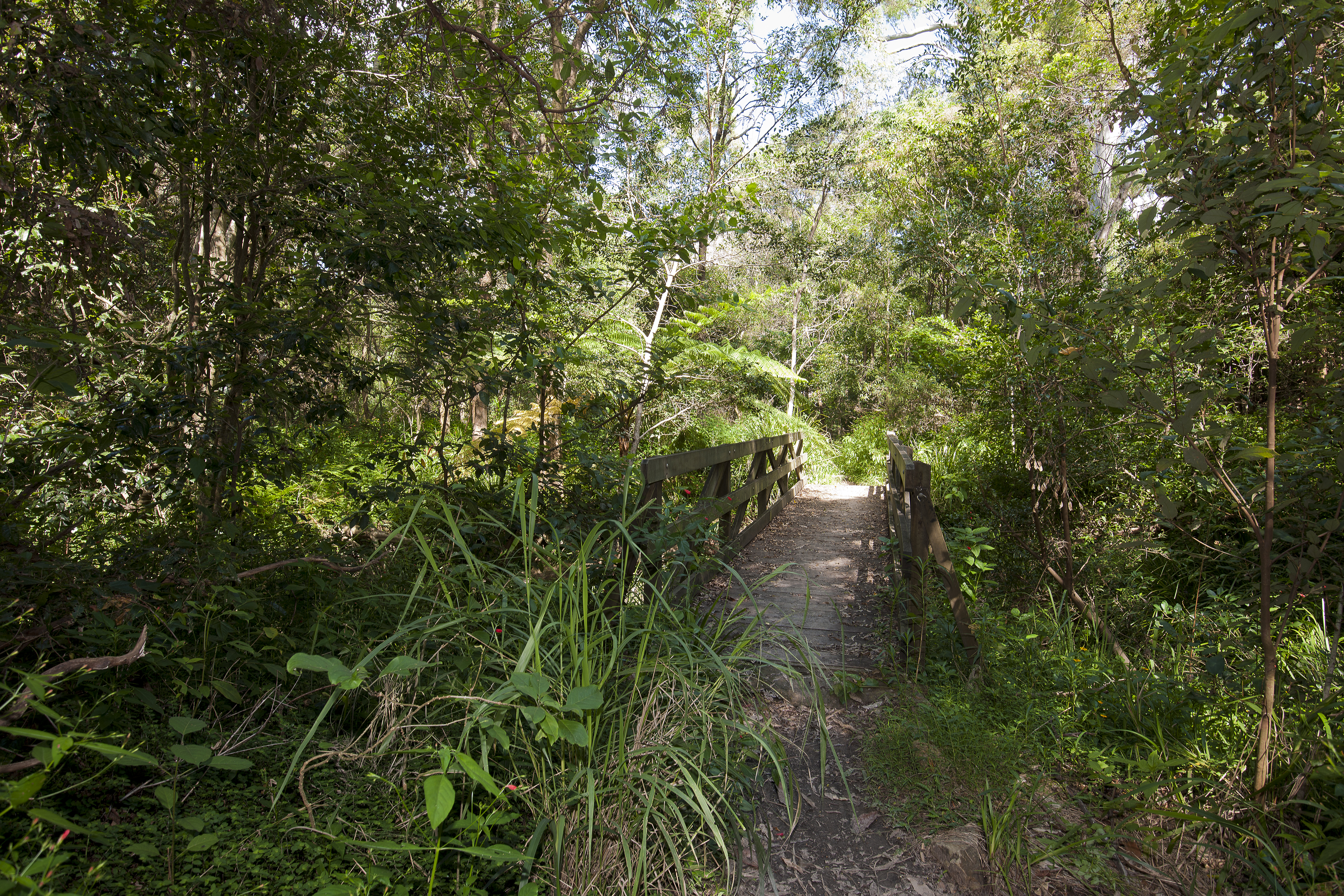
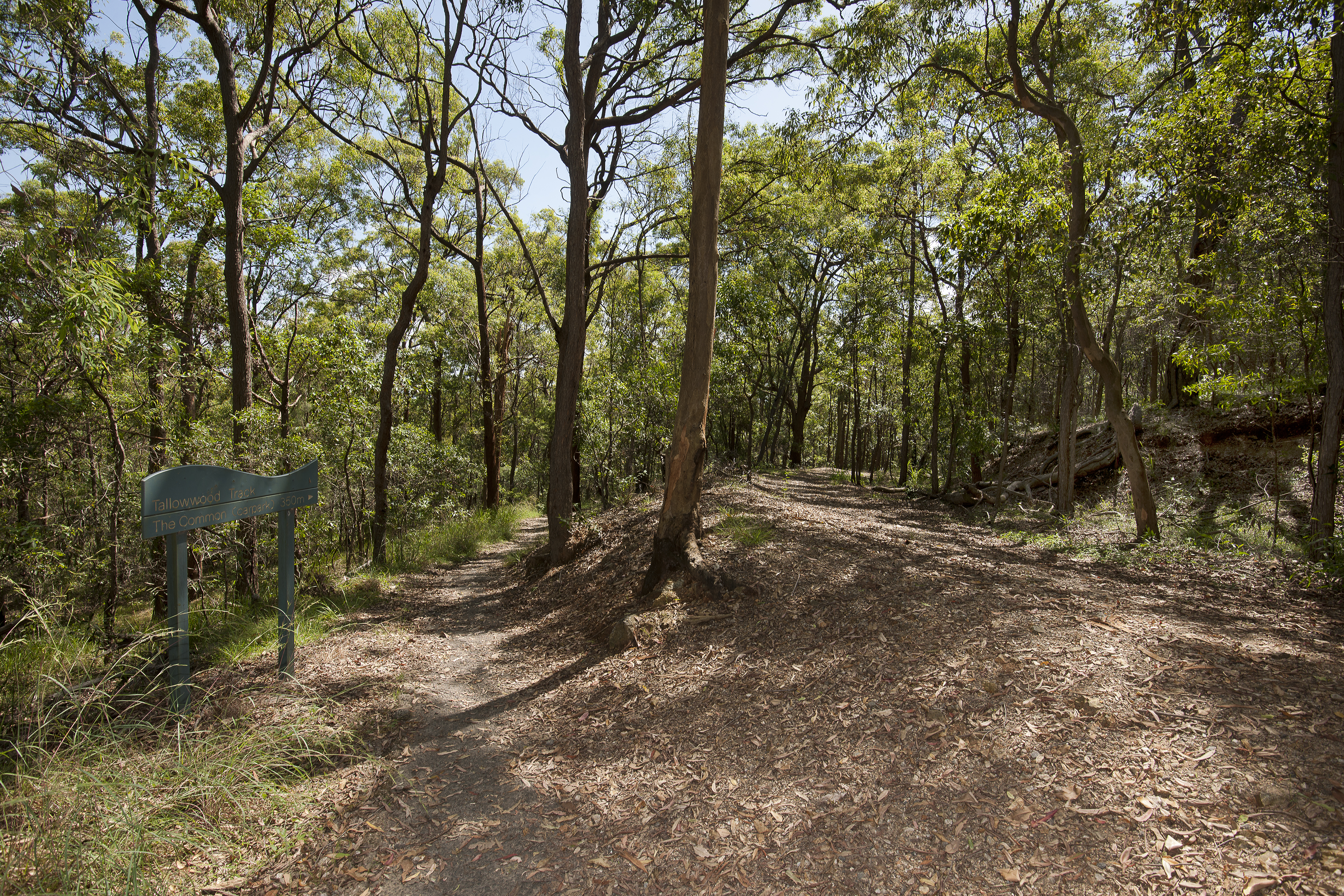
- Interactive map of Whites Hill Reserve
- Type: Nature park
- Location: Brisbane, Australia
- Area: 170 hectares (1.7 km^{2})
- Owner: Brisbane City Council

Whites Hill is a hill in the suburb of Camp Hill, City of Brisbane, Queensland, Australia. Surrounding the hill is Whites Hill Reserve, a public reserve occupying the south of the suburbs of Camp Hill and Carina Heights. The reserve covers an area of over 170 hectares (420 acres). The reserve offering many sporting and recreational facilities. Whites Hill lies within the catchment area of Bulimba Creek.

== History ==
The indigenous name for the area was Boolimba meaning place of magpie larks.

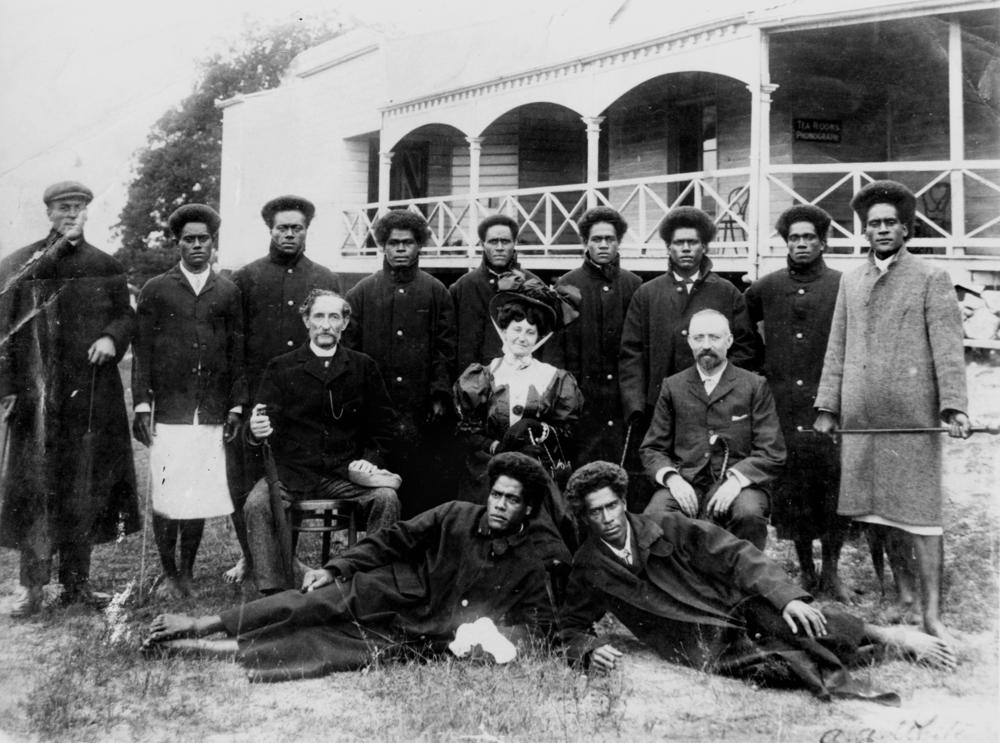
Fijian cricketers posing with the Whites Hill tearooms in the background

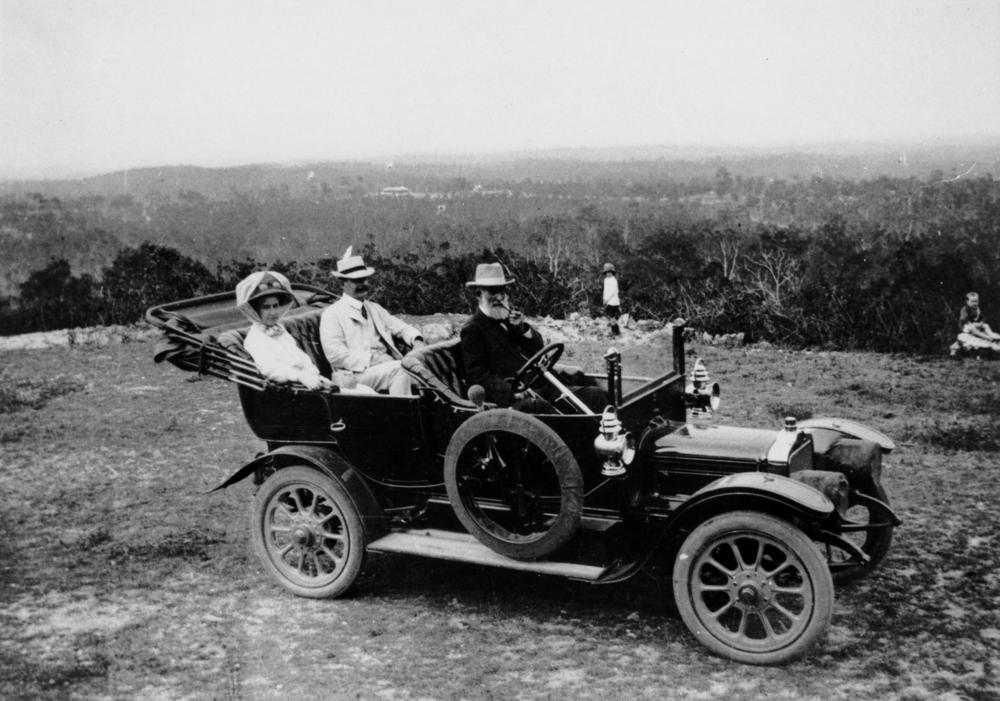
A Talbot touring car at Whites Hill in 1911

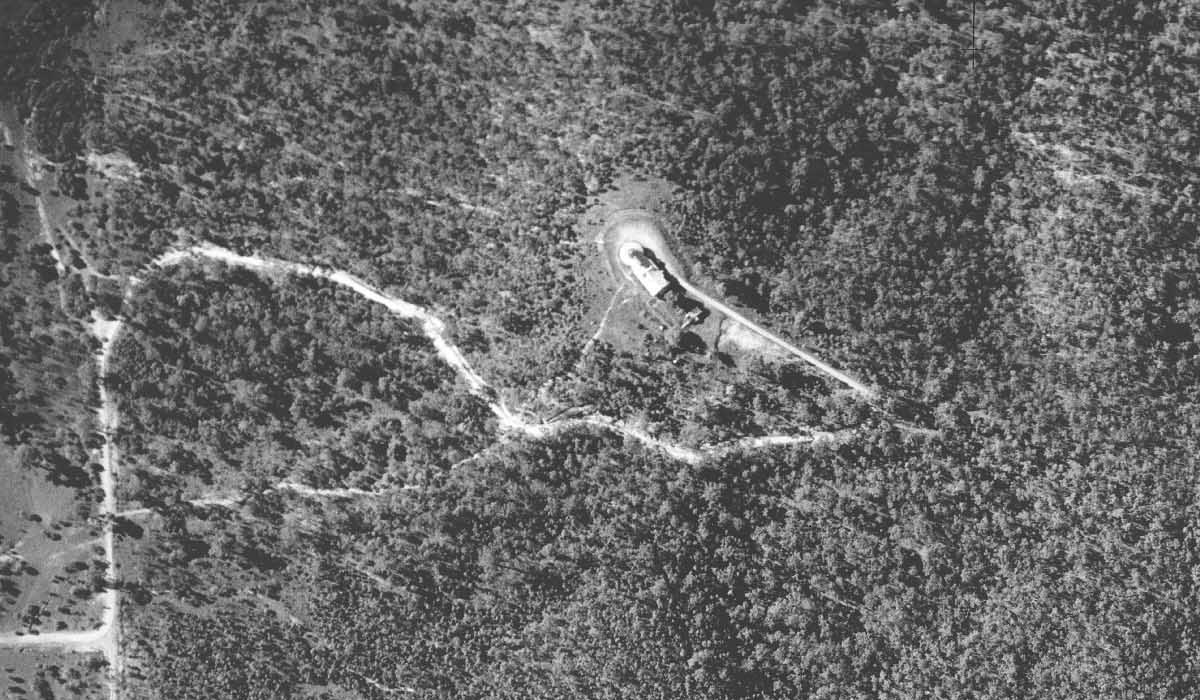
Aerial photography of Whites Hill tearooms on 20 April 1936

Whites Hill is named after Robert (Bob) White, who, in 1873, acquired 21.5 hectares (53 acres) of land surrounding the 120 metres (390 ft) elevation now known as Whites Hill. Halfway up the hill facing Coorparoo, the White family built their family home. In 1886, White installed a powerful telescope, which he allowed others to use.

Later White built a road to the top of the summit and built a house with huge verandahs to take advantage of the views of Brisbane city. Soon, the house was opened to the public with tea and meals available. Alcohol was also available, albeit illegally and White was prosecuted in 1890 for "sly grog-selling". The grandeur of this house proved popular with the locals and was frequently used for group outings, such as church groups, sporting groups, and scientific conventions.

Alcohol was not the only dispute that White had with the authorities. He had a long-running dispute in relation to the availability and condition of access roads to his property, a matter made more complicated by being within the jurisdictions of two local government authorities, Shire of Coorparoo and Bulimba Division which had to reach an agreement on the work and the division of the expenses.

Later, a camera obscura was constructed. It projected the Brisbane skyline onto a horizontal, circular, slightly concave table about 3 metres (9.8 ft) in diameter. This, as well as the installation of a music machine, made the house ideal for functions, with many weddings and parties taking place.

Brisbane City Council sought to acquire the land for development in 1924, offering Bob White £22000 for its sale. He declined and lived out his days on the property. Upon his death in January 1927, the land was sold to the council for less than half the original offer. With clear views of the Greater Brisbane Area from its peak, Whites Hill became an ideal observation post during the World War II and the army used the hill for training. The house remained on the land until 1964, where it was torn down after repeated acts of vandalism forced the council to condemn the residence.

Soon after, the land was developed into a reserve. An area of land was set aside for a public park, which includes a playground area, barbecue and toilet facilities and a sizeable area of parkland. Further development from the 1980s to present day has seen sporting clubs for cricket, soccer and touch football become established within the reserve. Kilometres of walking track also snake through the reserve, most notably to a reconstructed lookout on Whites Hill that provides excellent views of the Brisbane CBD and the lookout on Sankey's Mountain that looks out towards the coast.

The reserve was also the site of the Whites Hill Landfill and Recycling Facility, which closed in 1994 in favour of a larger facility in the Brisbane suburb of Chandler. Portions of the reserve near Pine Mountain have also been used as a quarry. Through community action however, much of that land has been rehabilitated. A Whites family reunion is held every five years.

== Environment ==
Whites Hill Reserve is characterised by a topographical ridge that extends from Pine Mountain through to Whites Hill (the highest elevation on the reserve at 120m). The reserve plays host to a range of local wildlife with a 1981 survey finding 58 species of bird, 1 of mammals and 4 species of reptiles. Today, there is also known to be a scattered koala population throughout the reserve. There are also echidnas, elf skinks and swamp wallabies.

The reserve's vegetation consists of tallowwood, grey gum, brush box, Queensland blue gum and white mahogany with small instances of rainforest. The rare Cupaniopsis shirleyana tree grows at several sites within the reserve. The Brisbane City Council actively practices anti-bushfire methods, such as sacrificial back burning. This involves controlled burn of selected sections of bushland to inhibit the spread of potentially damaging fires in the event of an emergency. The reserve is also dotted with a number of fire trails.

Volunteer work to restore and protect this ecosystem is conducted by the Whites Hill Bushcare and Environment Group, supported by Brisbane City Council’s Habitat Brisbane program. The group carries out weed management and native revegetation at monthly community working bees, and offers regular guided bushwalks to promote engagement with nature.

== Facilities ==
Whites Hill Reserve currently plays home to a number of sporting clubs and recreation facilities critical to servicing the demand in the local area. The Eastern Districts Junior Cricket Association has been based at Whites Hill for over 45 years though in practice since 7 August 2017 the cricket facilities including 4 cricket pitches (3 synthetic and 1 turf) as well as the Tom Lonegan Pavilion and practice nets have been successfully managed and maintained under sub-lease by the Holland Park Junior Cricket Club. In addition, The Holland Park Hawks lease two full size soccer pitches on site as well as a club house. There are also seven fully lit touch football fields located on the eastern side of Whites Hill managed by the Brisbane Metropolitan Touch Association, Australia's largest touch football affiliate. As Brisbane's only dedicated touch football facility, games are played 5 nights per week and the venue also hosts many large events including the Queensland All Schools each October. The reserve also features a number of barbecue areas and playgrounds, as well as several hundred square metres of cleared bushland.

== See also ==
- Brisbane native plants
- List of mountains in Australia
- List of parks in Brisbane
