= Carindale =

- Suburb
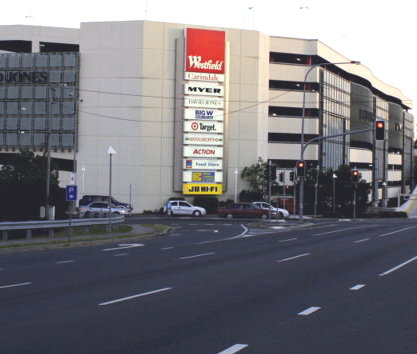
- Westfield Carindale from Creek Road

- Interactive map of Carindale
- Coordinates: 27.5102°S 153.1125°E
- Country: Australia
- State: Queensland
- City: Brisbane
- LGA: City of Brisbane (Chandler Ward)
- Location: 13.1 km (8.1 mi) SE of Brisbane CBD
- Established: 1980

Government
  - State electorate: Chatsworth
  - Federal division: Bonner

Area
  - Total: 10.3 km^{2} (4.0 sq mi)

Population
  - Total: 16,535 (2021 census)
  - Density: 1,605/km^{2} (4,158/sq mi)
- Time zone: UTC+10:00 (AEST)
- Postcode: 4152
Suburbs around Carindale
| Carina | Tingalpa | Belmont |
| Carina Heights | Carindale | Belmont |
| Mount Gravatt East | Mansfield | Mackenzie |

Carindale is a suburb of the City of Brisbane, Queensland, Australia. It is located 13.1 kilometres (8.1 mi) by road south-east of the Brisbane GPO, and borders Belmont, Carina, Carina Heights, Mackenzie, Mansfield, Mount Gravatt East, and Tingalpa. In the 2021 census, Carindale had a population of 16,535 people.

Notable features of the suburb include a large shopping centre – Westfield Carindale, the Pacific Golf Club, Belmont State School, Belmont Bushland Reserve, Belmont Private Hospital (psychiatric only) and Bulimba Creek. The Gateway Motorway borders the suburb.

== Toponymy ==
Carindale was the name of a housing estate constructed in the area in 1976 and was taken as the official name of the suburb when it separated from Belmont in 1980. The name itself is a combination of "Carin" from the nearby suburb of Carina, and "Dale" meaning valley.

== History ==
The area was first settled by Europeans in the 1850s, with activity focussing on timber and agriculture.

Belmont State School opened on 5 June 1876. It is now within the suburb boundaries of Carindale.

Carina State School opened on 30 January 1917. It is now within the suburb boundaries of Carindale.

St Gabriel The Archangel's Anglican Church was dedicated in 1958. A new church was dedicated in 1991 and consecrated in 2010.

In 1973, Carindale Nursing Home was opened in Foxglove St, Mt Gravatt East. In 1978, permission was granted to the developers to use Carindale as the name of the new shopping centre. In 1980, the suburb of Carindale was created.

Christian Outreach College opened on 16 May 1978 in West End. It relocated to Mansfield in 1982 but is now within the suburb boundaries of Carindale. It is now known as Citipointe Christian College.

The Carindale Library opened in 1999 with a major refurbishment in 2012.

== Demographics ==
In the 2011 census, Carindale had a population of 15,577 people, 51.6% female and 48.4% male. The median age of the Carindale population was 40 years of age, 3 years above the Australian median of 37. 67.6% of people living in Carindale were born in Australia, the next most common countries of birth were New Zealand 3.6%, England 3.5%, South Africa 3.0%, China (excludes SARs and Taiwan) 1.6%, and India 1.3%. 75.8% of people spoke only English at home; the next most popular languages were Greek 3.6%, Cantonese 2.4%, Mandarin 2.0%, Italian 1.9%, and Afrikaans 1.4%.

In the 2016 census, Carindale had a population of 15,740 people, 51.4% female and 48.6% male. The median age of the Carindale population was 42 years of age, 4 years above the Australian median of 38. 65.3% of people living in Carindale were born in Australia, compared to the national average of 66.7%; the next most common countries of birth were New Zealand 3.5%, England 3.2%, China 2.8%, South Africa 2.4%, and India 1.7%. 71.5% of people spoke only English at home; the next most popular languages were Mandarin 4.2%, Greek 3.6%, Cantonese 3.3%, Italian 1.7%, 1.1% Afrikaans. According to the 2016 census, Carindale includes the largest Greek Australian community of any suburb in Queensland, numbering 746 individuals and making up 4.7% of the suburb's population.

In the 2021 census, Carindale had a population of 16,535 people 51.3% female and 48.7% male. The median age of the Carindale population was 43 years of age, 5 years above the Australian median of 38. 64.0% of people living in Carindale were born in Australia, the next most common countries of birth were China (excludes SARs and Taiwan) 4.5%, New Zealand 3.0%, England 2.8%, South Africa 2.5%, and India 2.3%. 68.6% of people spoke only English at home; the next most popular languages were Mandarin 6.5%, Cantonese 2.9%, Greek 2.8%, Korean 1.4%, and Italian 1.4%.

== Education ==
Belmont State School is a government primary (Prep–6) school for boys and girls on Old Cleveland Road (27.5030°S 153.1156°E). In 2018, the school had an enrolment of 911 students with 63 teachers (57 full-time equivalent) and 33 non-teaching staff (21 full-time equivalent). It includes a special education program.

Carina State School is a government primary (Prep–6) school for boys and girls at 1413 Creek Road (27.4933°S 153.1018°E). In 2018, the school had an enrolment of 324 students with 32 teachers (22 full-time equivalent) and 19 non-teaching staff (12 full-time equivalent).

Citipointe Christian College (formerly The Christian Outreach College Brisbane) is a private primary and secondary (Prep–12) school for boys and girls at 322 Wecker Road (27.5348°S 153.1132°E). In 2018, the school had an enrolment of 1,648 students with 146 teachers (131 full-time equivalent) and 91 non-teaching staff (60 full-time equivalent).

There are no government secondary schools in Carindale. The nearest government secondary schools are Whites Hill State College in Camp Hill to the west, Cavendish Road State High School in Holland Park to th south-west, and Mansfield State High School in neighbouring Mansfield to the south.

== Amenities ==
The suburb is home to one of the largest Westfield shopping centres in Brisbane, Westfield Carindale. This large shopping complex has over 400 stores.

- The Carindale public library is operated by Brisbane City Council
- St Gabriel the Archangel's Anglican Church

== Transport ==
Public transport runs frequently to and from Carindale and Brisbane CBD via Old Cleveland Road and Creek Road, leading to the South East Busway.
