= Carina Heights, Queensland =

Carina Heights
- Suburb
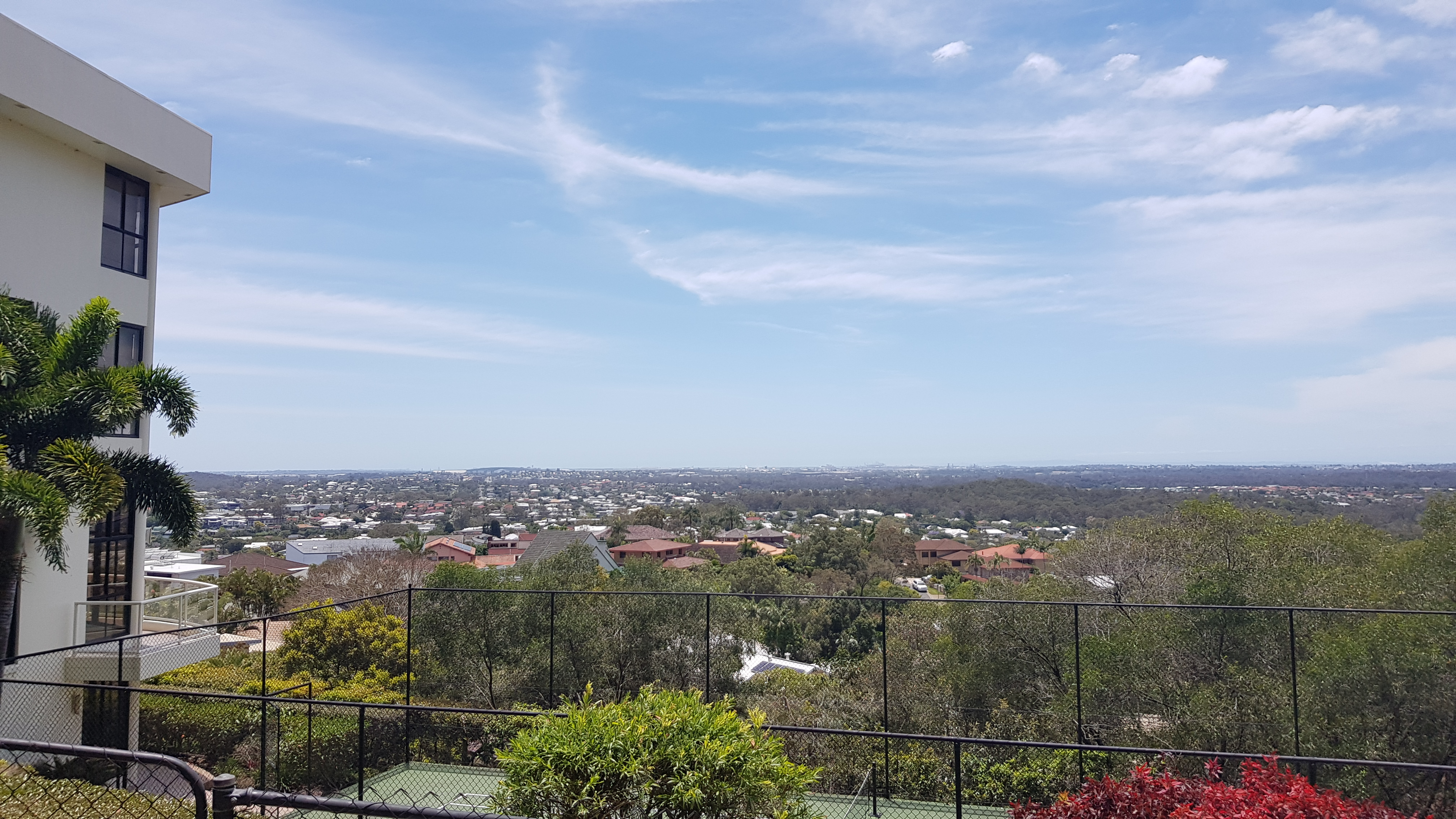
- View from Whites Hill Reserve, 2022

- Interactive map of Carina Heights
- Coordinates: 27.5063°S 153.0925°E
- Country: Australia
- State: Queensland
- City: Brisbane
- LGA: City of Brisbane (Coorparoo Ward)
- Location: 10.1 km (6.3 mi) SE of Brisbane CBD

Government
  - State electorates: Chatsworth; Greenslopes
  - Federal division: Griffith

Area
  - Total: 3.4 km^{2} (1.3 sq mi)

Population
  - Total: 7,103 (2021 census)
  - Density: 2,089/km^{2} (5,410/sq mi)
- Time zone: UTC+10:00 (AEST)
- Postcode: 4152
Suburbs around Carina Heights
Camp Hill	Carina	Carindale
Camp Hill	Carina Heights	Carindale
Holland Park	Mount Gravatt East	Mansfield

Carina Heights is both a hill and a suburb in the City of Brisbane, Queensland, Australia. It is 10.1 kilometres (6.3 mi) by road south-east of the Brisbane GPO. In the 2021 census, Carina Heights had a population of 7,103 people.

== Geography ==
Carina Heights borders Camp Hill, Carina, Carindale, Mansfield, Mount Gravatt East, and Holland Park.

Carina Heights (the hill) is in the north-east corner of the suburb (27.5006°S 153.0989°E) rising to 36 metres (118 ft) above sea level.

Pine Mountain is in the south of the suburb (27.5096°S 153.0889°E) rising to 106 metres (348 ft) above sea level. It is within Whites Hill Reserve which occupies the south-west of the suburb, extending into neighbouring Camp Hill. Most of the developed recreational facilities are in the Camp Hill part of the reserve. The major use of the reserve within Carina Heights is the former Pine Mountain quarry, which is now used as a site to recycle asphalt removed from roads to create new asphalt.

== History ==
Carina Heights is named after the neighbouring suburb Carina, from which it was officially separated in 1975. The name Carina comes from an estate on Creek Road constructed in the 1850s. The property belonged to Ebenezer Thorne, and was named after Thorne's daughter Kate Carina Thorne.

== Demographics ==
In the 2011 census, Carina Heights had a population of 6,110 people, of whom 52.5% were female and 47.5% were male. The median age of the population was 35; 2 years below the Australian median. 72.3% of people living in Carina Heights were born in Australia compared to the national average of 69.8%, with the next most common countries of birth being New Zealand (4.3%), England (3.3%), South Korea (1.3%), India (1.1%), and the Philippines (1%). 80.8% of people spoke only English at home; the next most popular languages were Spanish (1.5%), Korean (1.4%), Italian (1.4%), Greek (1%), and Cantonese 0.9%.

In the 2016 census, Carina Heights had a population of 6,732 people.

In the 2021 census, Carina Heights had a population of 7,103 people.

== Education ==
There are no schools in Carina Heights. The nearest government primary schools are Whites Hill State College in neighbouring Camp Hill to the west, Carina State School in neighbouring Carina to the north, and Mount Gravatt East State School in neighbouring Mount Gravatt East. The nearest government secondary schools are Whites Hill State College in neighbouring Camp Hill to the west and Cavendish Road State High School in neighbouring Holland Park to the south-west.

== Facilities ==
Belmont Private Hospital is a 150-bed private psychiatric hospital. It is at 1220 Creek Road on the top of the hill Carina Heights (27.5010°S 153.0989°E).

== Amenities ==
Living Faith Uniting Church is at 330 Pine Mountain Road (27.5173°S 153.0961°E). It holds weekly Sunday services.

There are a number of parks in the suburb, including:

- Abbott Street Park (27.4998°S 153.0860°E)
- Anzac Road Park (27.4984°S 153.0921°E)
- Buckley Street Park (27.5092°S 153.0956°E)
- Gaffney Street Park (27.5026°S 153.0985°E)
- Jones Road Park (27.5003°S 153.0872°E)
- Olivia Drive Park (27.5142°S 153.0944°E)
- Pine Mountain Road (no. 284) (27.5152°S 153.0921°E)
- Whatmore Street Park (27.4995°S 153.0968°E)
- Whites Hill Reserve (27.5128°S 153.0860°E)
- Willard Street Park (27.5052°S 153.0935°E)

== Street names ==
A number of street names in Carina Heights are identical to the surnames of former Members of the Queensland Legislative Assembly. These include:

- Buckley Street
- Buzacott Street
- Chataway Street
- Jones Road
- Macalister Street
- Maughan Street
- McGahan Street
- Summerville Street
- Swayne Street
- Wilkinson Street
- Winstanley Street

Some other street names are identical to the surnames of prominent citizens of Brisbane. These include:

- Hecklemann Street
- Whatmore Street - may have been named for George Willoughby Whatmore, a Brisbane motor dealer, yachting official and city councillor. He was, for the four years prior to his death, the owner of the historic home Nyrambla in the suburb of Ascot.

Another group of street names are derived from World War I. They include:

- Anzac Road
- Birdwood Road
- Gallipoli Road
- Mons Road
- Salonica Road
- Vickers Street
