= Norman Park railway station =

Railway station in Queensland, Australia

Norman Park
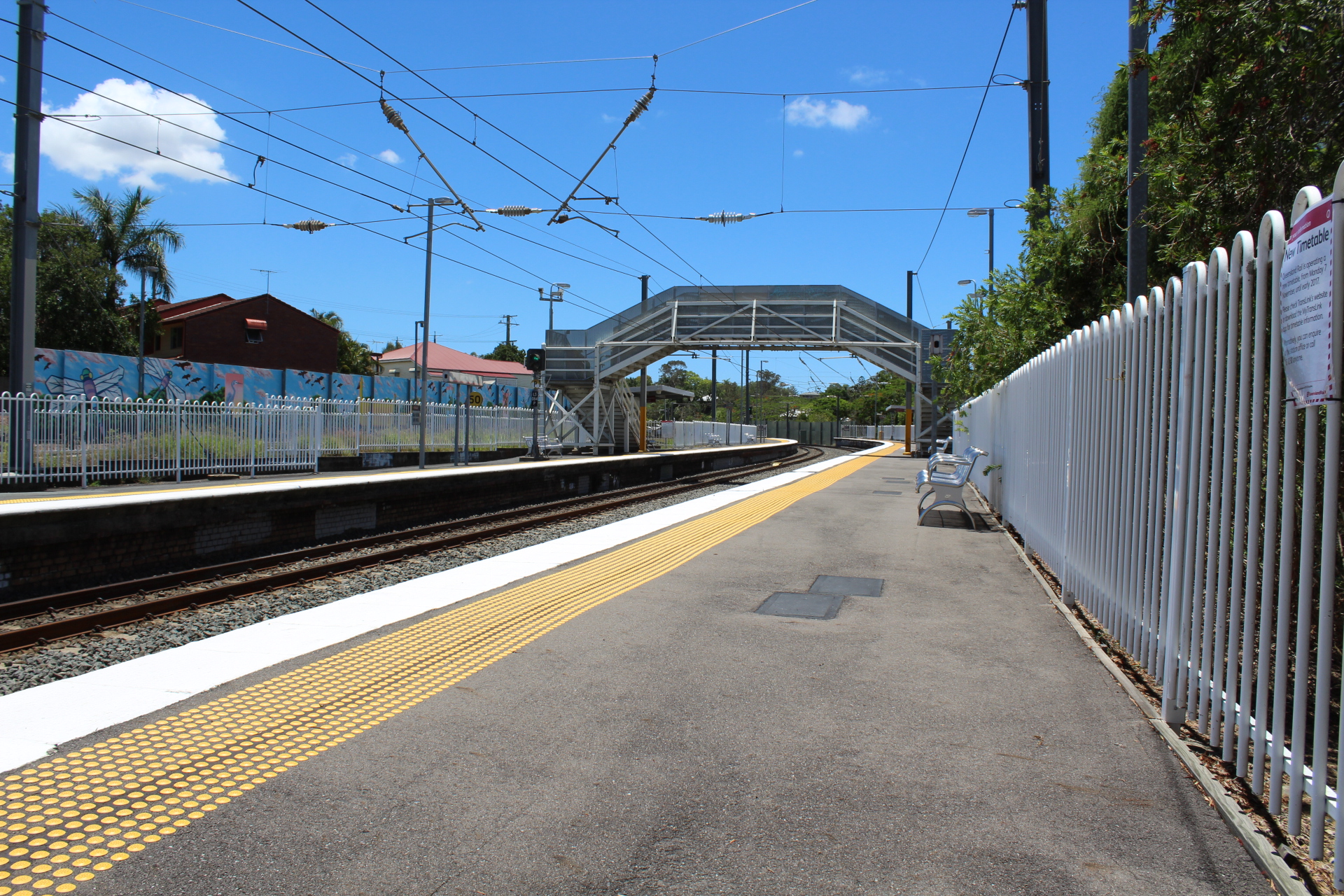
- Westbound view from Platform 2, December 2016

General information
- Location: Waite Street, Norman Park
- Coordinates: 27°28′54″S 153°03′45″E
- Owner: Queensland Rail
- Operator: Queensland Rail
- Line: Cleveland
- Distance: 9.07 kilometres from Central
- Platforms: 2 side
- Tracks: 3

Construction
- Structure type: Ground
- Parking: 112 bays
- Cycle facilities: Yes
- Accessible: Assisted

Other information
- Station code: 600252 (platform 1); 600253 (platform 2)
- Fare zone: Zone 1
- Website: Translink

History
- Opened: 1911

Services
Preceding station	Queensland Rail	Following station
Coorparoo towards Shorncliffe via Roma Street	Cleveland line	Morningside towards Cleveland
Location

Norman Park is a railway station operated by Queensland Rail on the Cleveland line. It opened in 1911 and serves the Brisbane suburb of Norman Park. It is a ground level station, featuring two side platforms.

== History ==
Norman Park station opened in 1911. Between 1912 and 1926 it was the Junction station for the Belmont Tramway. The steam tram was initially operated by the Belmont Shire Council and after 1925 by the Brisbane City Council until its closure in 1926.

On 15 July 1996, the Fisherman Islands line to the Port of Brisbane opened to the north of the station.

== Services ==
Norman Park is served by Cleveland line services from Shorncliffe, Northgate, Doomben and Bowen Hills to Cannon Hill, Manly and Cleveland.

== Platforms and services ==
Norman Park platform arrangement
Platform	Line	Destination	Notes
1	Cleveland	Cleveland	
2	Cleveland	Roma Street (to Shorncliffe line)	

== Murals ==
The walls of the station were decorated with artwork featuring flora, fauna and scenery from the area circa 2009. It was painted by a team of professional artists with input from students from local schools.
