= Cannon Hill bus station =

Bus station in Brisbane, Australia

Cannon Hill
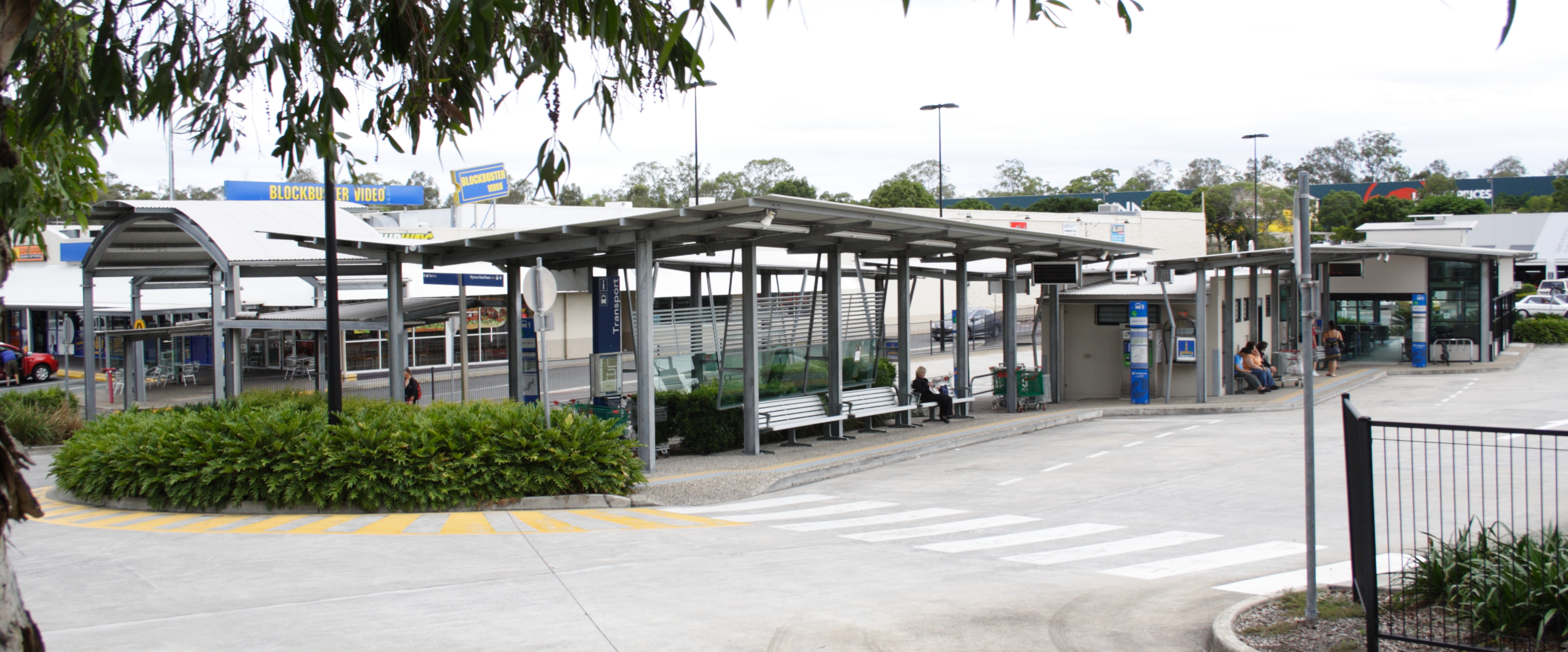

General information
- Location: Wynnum and Creek Roads, Cannon Hill
- Coordinates: 27.470608°S 153.096478°E
- Platforms: 1 island platform, 2 stops

Construction
- Parking: Park and ride
- Cycle facilities: Bicycle stands
- Accessible: yes

Other information
- Fare zone: Zone 1/2

History
- Opened: 14 April 2003; 23 years ago
Location

Cannon Hill is a bus station operated by Translink. It opened in 2003 and is located at Cannon Hill Kmart Plaza in the Brisbane suburb of Cannon Hill. It is a ground level station, featuring one side platform.

The bus station is proposed to be upgraded, with the design phase completed as of 2023. The Queensland Government has invested A$1.69 million (2023) (US$1.13 million) for the design phase. The upgrade plans to improve operational efficiency and safety for passengers and ensure the bus station complies with accessibility regulations.
