= Shire of Belmont =

Former local government area in Queensland

Coordinates: 27.5119°S 153.128°E

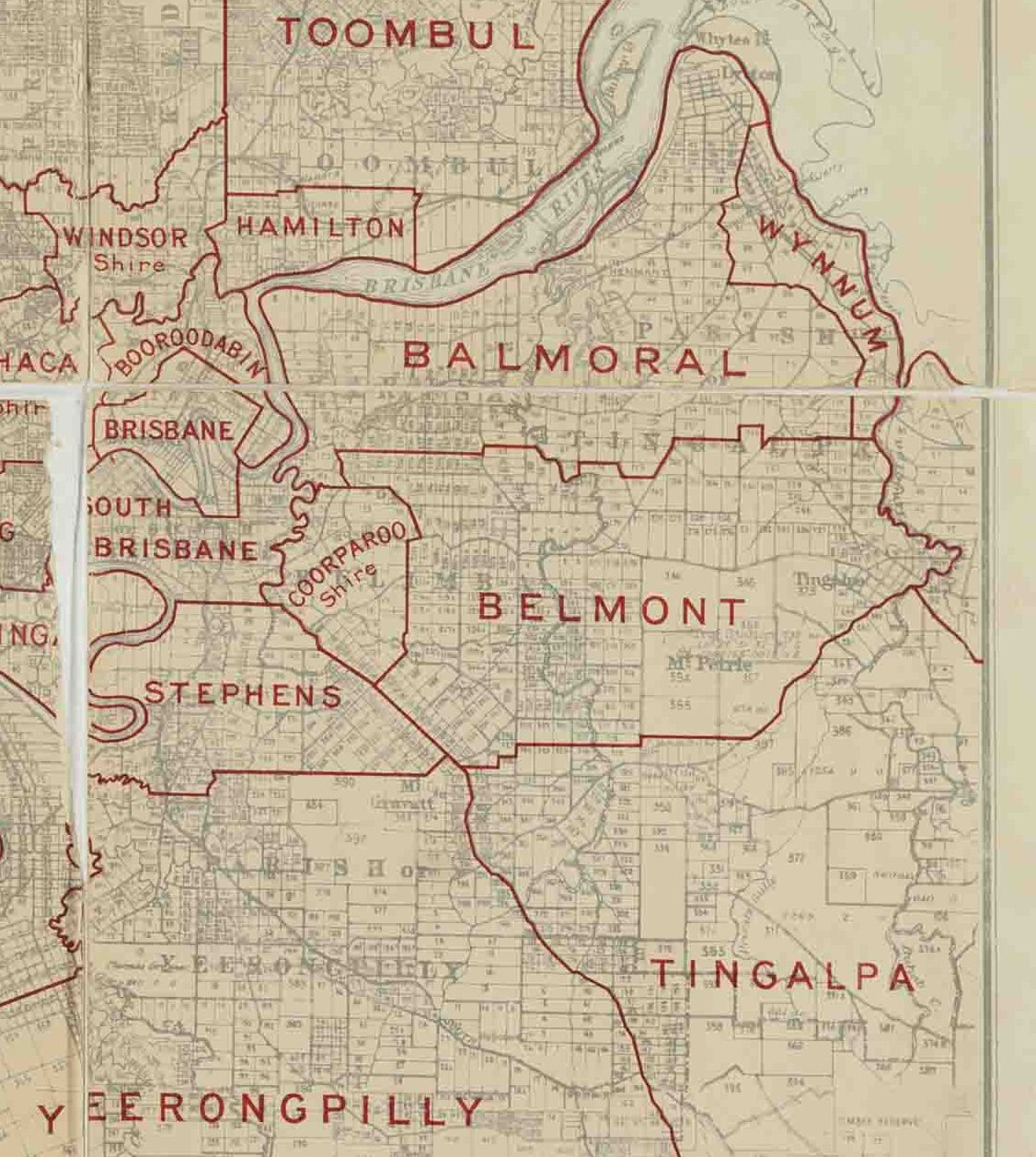
Map of Belmont Division and adjacent local government areas, March 1902. The unlabelled division east of Belmont Division is Cleveland Division.

The Shire of Belmont is a former local government area of Queensland, Australia, located in eastern Brisbane including the current suburb of Belmont.

== History ==
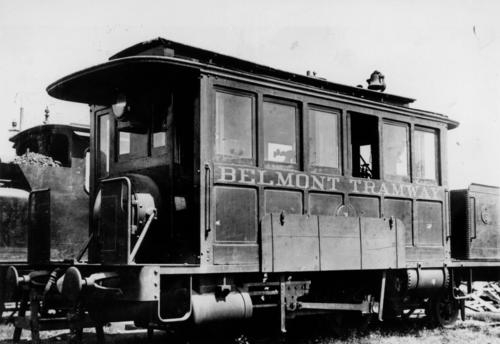
Belmont tram, 1912

The Bulimba Division was one of the original divisions created on 11 November 1879 under the Divisional Boards Act 1879 with a population of 2007.

On 4 January 1888, the No. 2 subdivision of Bulimba Division was separated to create the new Kianawah Division (later renamed Wynnum Division).

On 19 January 1888, the No. 1 subdivision of Bulimba Division was separated to create Balmoral Division.

On 24 October 1888, the western part of the division was split off to create Shire of Coorparoo.

On 17 March 1892, there was an alteration of boundaries. The Pritchard's Road land and gravel reserve (100 acres) were transferred from Kianawah Division to Balmoral Division. The Grassdale Estate land was transferred from Kianawah Division to Bulimba Division.

On 3 November 1894, the remaining part of Bulimba Division was renamed Belmont Division.

The Local Authorities Act 1902 replaced all Divisions with Towns and Shires, replacing the Belmont Division with the Shire of Belmont on 31 March 1903.

In the belief that the shire was unable to develop properly without a railway service, the shire built its own railway, the Belmont Tramway, which was officially opened on Saturday 25 May 1912.

On 1 October 1925, the shire was amalgamated into the City of Brisbane.

== Chairmen ==
- 1893: J. Stewart
- 1925: A.C. Pryke

== See also ==
- List of tramways in Queensland
