= Belmont Tramway =

Former railway line in Brisbane, Queensland

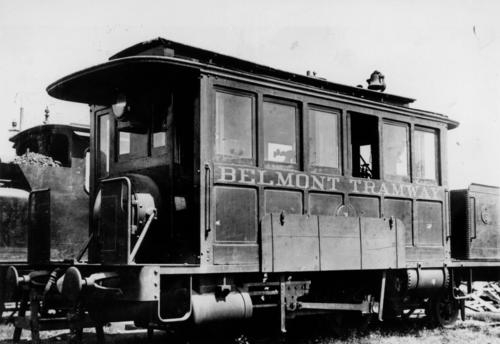
- Belmont steam tram c1912

Overview
- Owner: Belmont Shire Council; Brisbane City Council

Service
- Operator(s): Belmont Shire Council; Queensland Railways

History
- Opened: 25 May 1912
- Closed: 30 October 1926

Technical
- Line length: 4 miles 6 chains (4.08 miles, 6.56 km)
- Track gauge: 1,067 mm (3 ft 6 in)

The Belmont Tramway was a short-lived railway in the south-eastern suburbs of Brisbane, the state capital of Queensland, Australia. It was built by the Belmont Shire Council and opened in 1912. Services were suspended several times and the line formally closed in October 1926.

== History ==
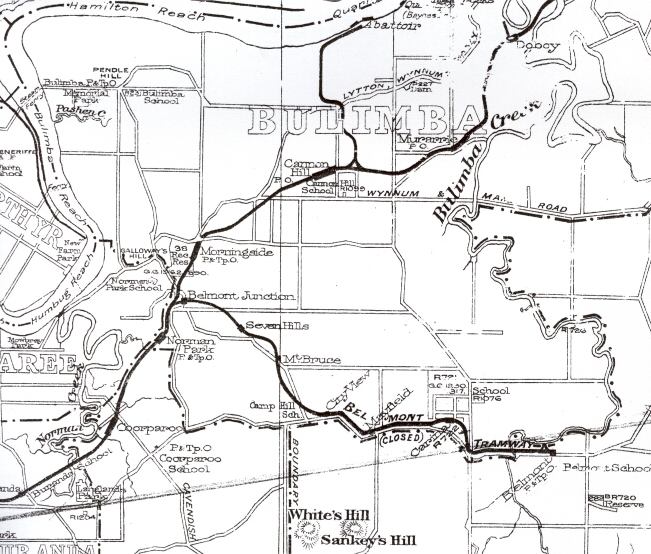
Portion of a 1915 map showing the Belmont Tramway

The Tramways Act of 1882 gave local councils in Queensland powers to build railways which did not compete with the Queensland Railways. For legal reasons they were considered to be tramways.

The construction was proposed in 1909 and the Belmont Shire Council requested an engineering report on the cost of a tramway. The Shire constructed a tramway 4.3 miles (6.9 km) long from a junction on the Cleveland railway line between Norman Park and Morningside. There were passenger shelters at Belmont Junction, Seven Hills, Mount Bruce, City View, Mayfield Road, Carina and stations with goods facilities at Springfield and the terminus at Belmont. The cost of construction was £20,000.

The line was originally operated by Queensland Railways until the Shire acquired its own steam tram (Baldwin b/n 35935 of 1911) and three carriages. The maximum speed was 15 mph (24 km/h) with a limit of 10 mph (16 km/h) over the bridges. It was expensive to operate and services were suspended in 1915, at which time the Shire's tram and carriages were sold.

The line was reopened due to local agitation and was operated by Queensland Railways on behalf of the Shire until 16 April 1924, when services were again suspended due to the condition of the bridges. The locomotives permitted to work the line were the A12, A14, B13, B15 and PB15 class.

The line reopened again in April 1925 but the Brisbane City Council, which had absorbed the Shire, was not interested in running the tramway at a loss and it finally closed in October 1926.

664 metres of the track bed along Old Cleveland Road became part of the Brisbane City Council electric tram route 06 (Valley – Belmont) in 1948.

== See also ==
- List of tramways in Queensland
