= Hemmant Christian Community Church =

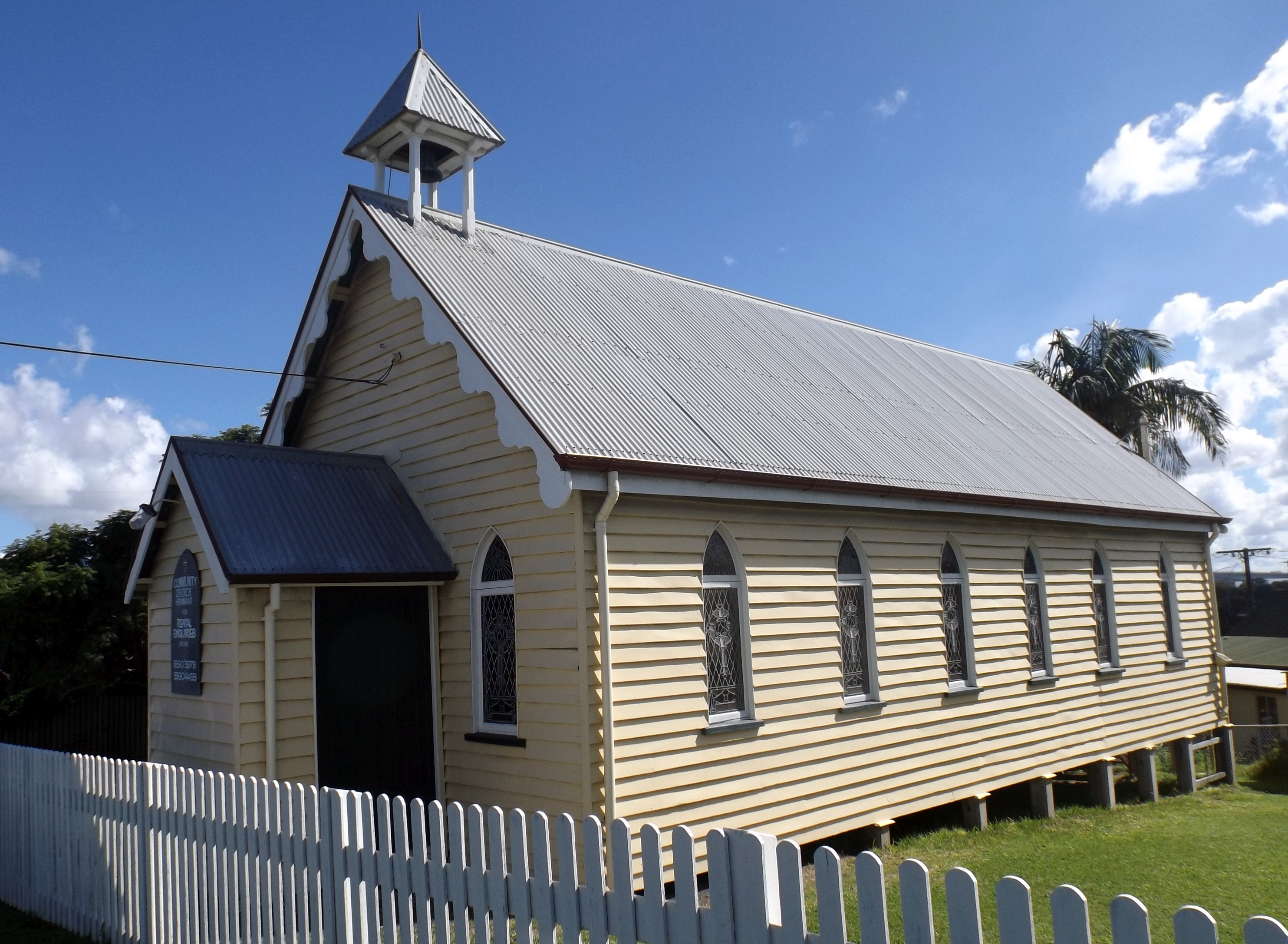
- Hemmant Christian Community Church, 2015
- Hemmant Christian Community Church
- 27°26′56″S 153°07′35″E
- Address: 69 Hemmant Road, Hemmant, City of Brisbane, Queensland
- Country: Australia
- Denomination: Union: non-denominational (since c. 1990s)
- Previous denomination: Methodist (1865 – 1977); Uniting (1977 – 1988)

History
- Former names: Tingalpa Wesleyan Methodist Church; Hemmant Methodist Church; Hemmant Uniting Church
- Status: Church
- Dedicated: November 1866

Architecture
- Architectural type: Church
- Style: Gothic Revival
- Years built: 1865 – 1866

Specifications
- Materials: Timber

Queensland Heritage Register
- Official name: Hemmant Christian Community Church; Hemmant Methodist Church; Hemmant Uniting Church; Tingalpa Wesleyan Methodist Church
- Type: State heritage (built)
- Designated: 21 October 1992
- Reference no.: 600221
- Significant period: 1865–66 (fabric); 1866–88 (historical)
- Significant components: Memorial – window

Hemmant Christian Community Church is a heritage-listed Union church at 69 Hemmant Road, Hemmant, City of Brisbane, Queensland, Australia. It was built from 1865 to 1866 as a Methodist church. It is also known as Hemmant Methodist Church, Hemmant Uniting Church, and Tingalpa Wesleyan Methodist Church. It was added to the Queensland Heritage Register on 21 October 1992.

== History ==
This building was opened in November 1866 as the Tingalpa Wesleyan Methodist Church, within the East Brisbane Circuit – later incorporated into the Wynnum Circuit as the Hemmant Methodist Church.

The Tingalpa district, which included Hemmant, had been opened up to farming in 1859. Settlement expanded following the introduction of the 1864 Coffee and Sugar Regulations, when most of the land in the district along Doughboy Creek (Bulimba Creek) and the Brisbane River was taken up for sugar growing. The Reverend Beaizley called for tenders for the construction of a Wesleyan Church at Church Hill, Tingalpa in August–September 1865. The building was officially opened in November 1866. Local involvement included that of the Hon. Angus Gibson, Member of the Queensland Legislative Council, who served as a church trustee for 50 years. Together with the Hemmant State School, built in 1864, the church contributed to the nucleus of the village of Hemmant.

The building was extended by 5 metres (16 ft) at an unknown date, and in 1947 the windows and most of the interior fittings and furniture were replaced.

Hemmant Methodist Church functioned as the Hemmant Uniting Church following the amalgamation of Methodist, Presbyterian and Congregational churches as the Uniting Church in Australia in the mid-1970s. In 1988 it was closed due to a declining congregation. Saved from demolition by a local community group, the building was re-opened as the non-denominational Hemmant Christian Community Church.

== Description ==
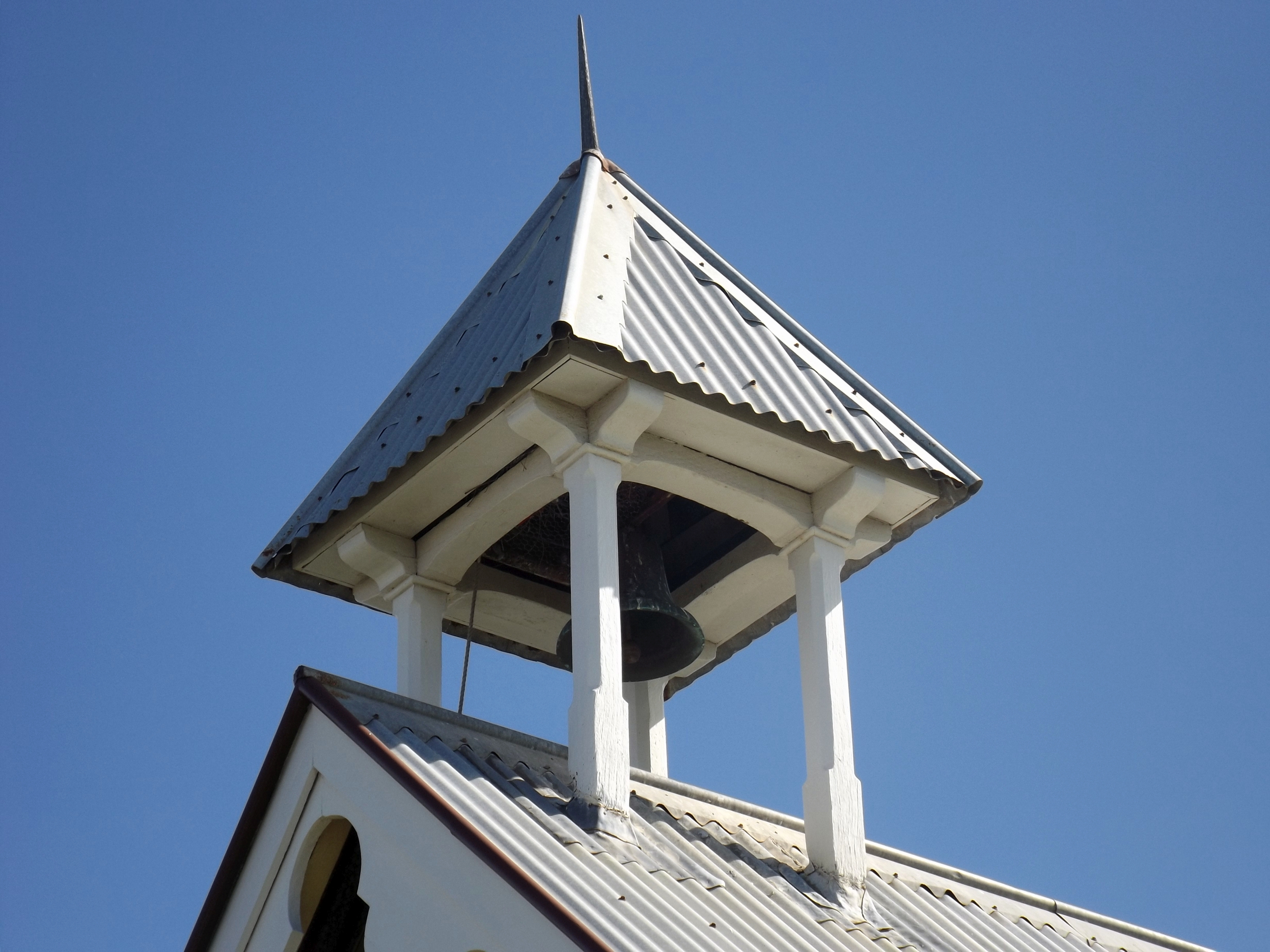
Bell turret, 2015

This weatherboard church is rectangular in shape with a small gabled front porch. A bellcote surmounts the front of the gable roof which is in corrugated iron. The front gable is decorated with scalloped timber barge boards. There are 6 gothic-style leadlight windows along each side of the building and two at the front. They are all memorials to the church's pioneer families.

The interior walls and ceiling are lined with horizontal double-headed tongue and groove boards. A folding timber screen divides the building in two, separating the church from a meeting room.

== Heritage listing ==
Hemmant Christian Community Church was listed on the Queensland Heritage Register on 21 October 1992 having satisfied the following criteria.

The place is important in demonstrating the evolution or pattern of Queensland's history.

Hemmant Christian Community Church, erected in 1865–66, is significant historically as one of the oldest churches in Brisbane, associated with the early establishment of Methodism in Queensland and with the development of Tingalpa/Hemmant as a farming district in the second half of the 19th century.

The place is important in demonstrating the principal characteristics of a particular class of cultural places.

The building illustrates the principal characteristics of a modest, 19th century timber gothic-style church in Queensland, and has functioned as a community focus and landmark for over 130 years.

The place has a strong or special association with a particular community or cultural group for social, cultural or spiritual reasons.

The building illustrates the principal characteristics of a modest, 19th century timber gothic-style church in Queensland, and has functioned as a community focus and landmark for over 130 years.
