= Parks and gardens of Brisbane =

This is a list of major parks, gardens, and nature reserves in Brisbane, Queensland, Australia.

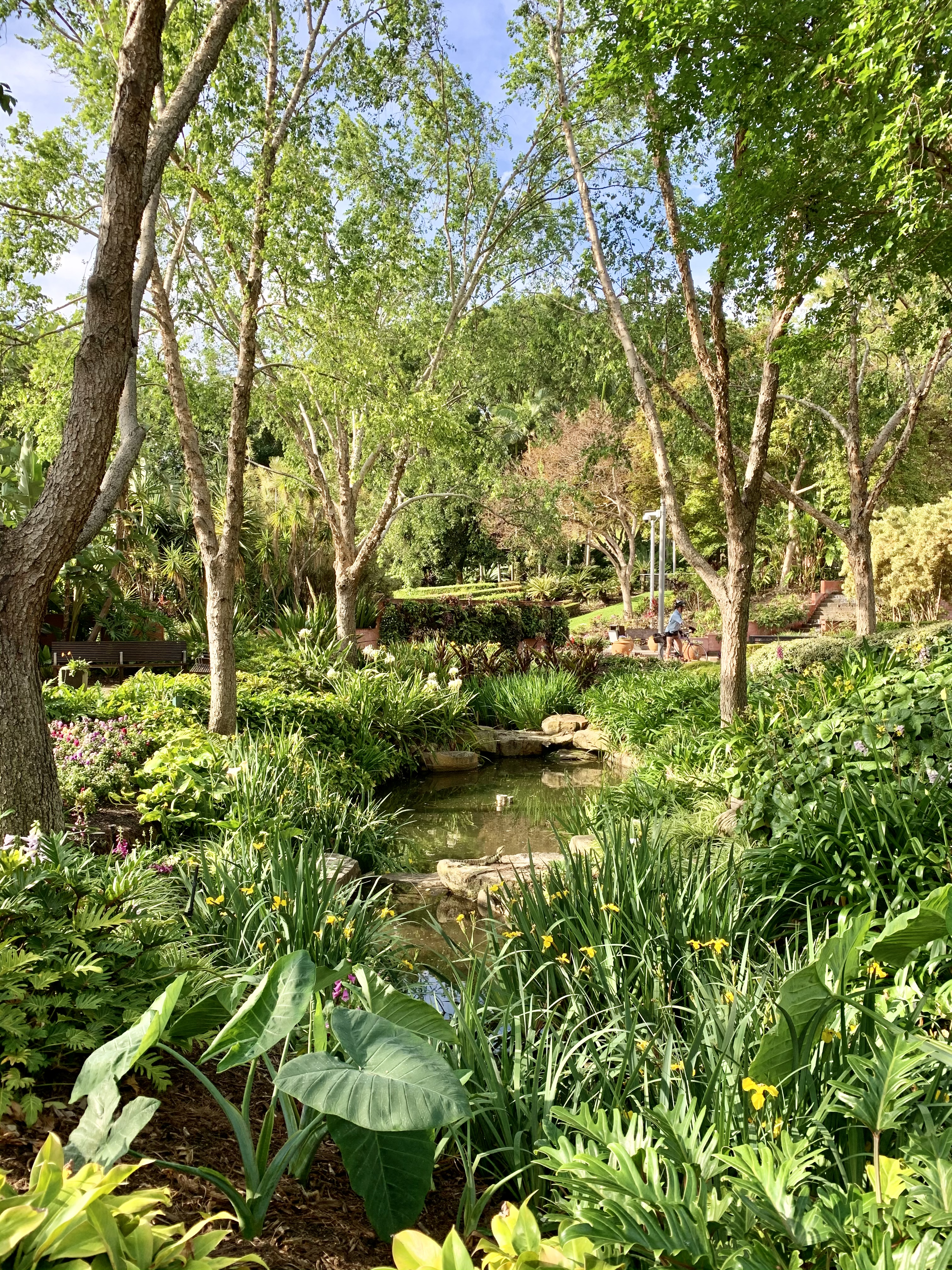
Roma Street Parklands, 2020

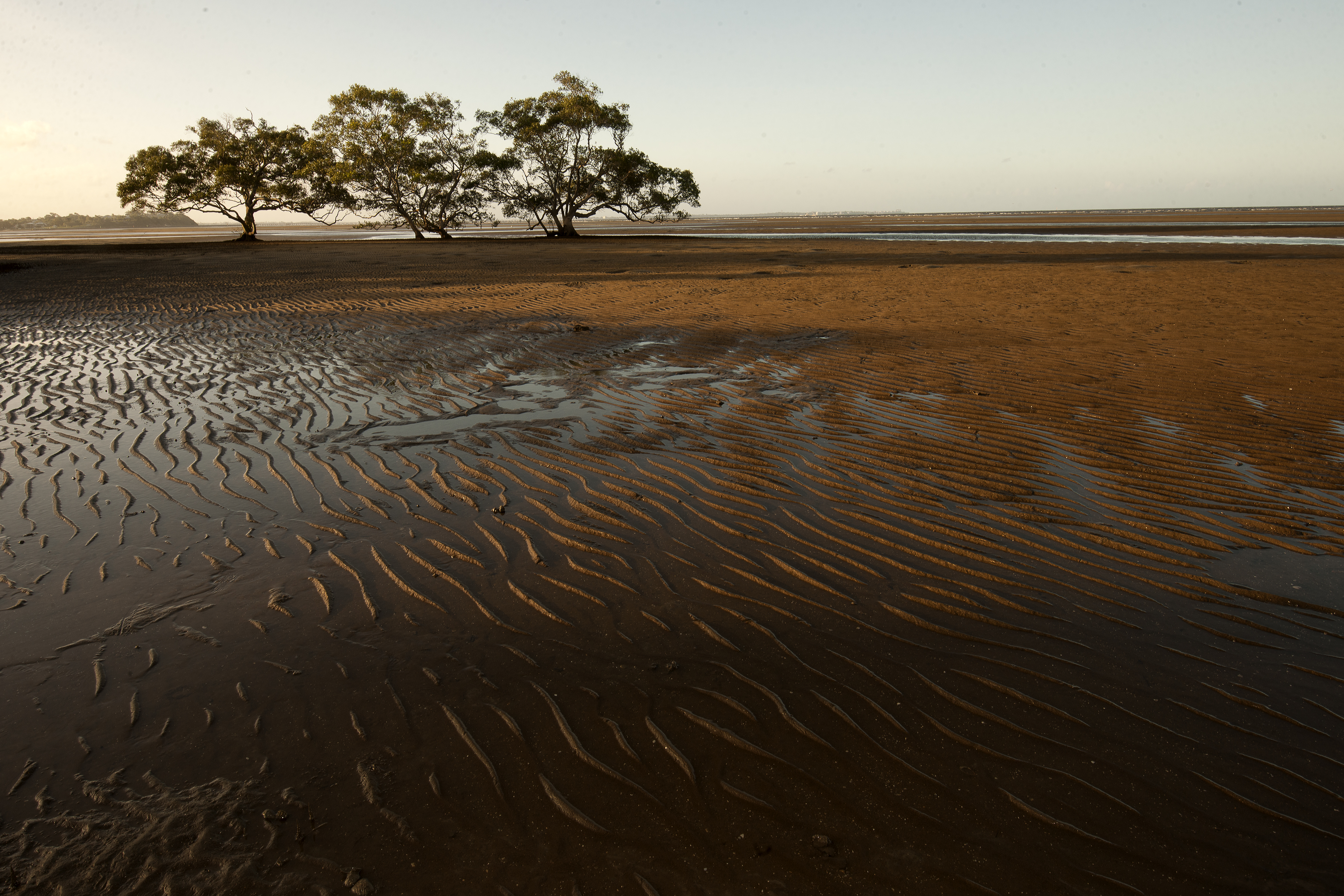
Boondall Wetlands, 2012

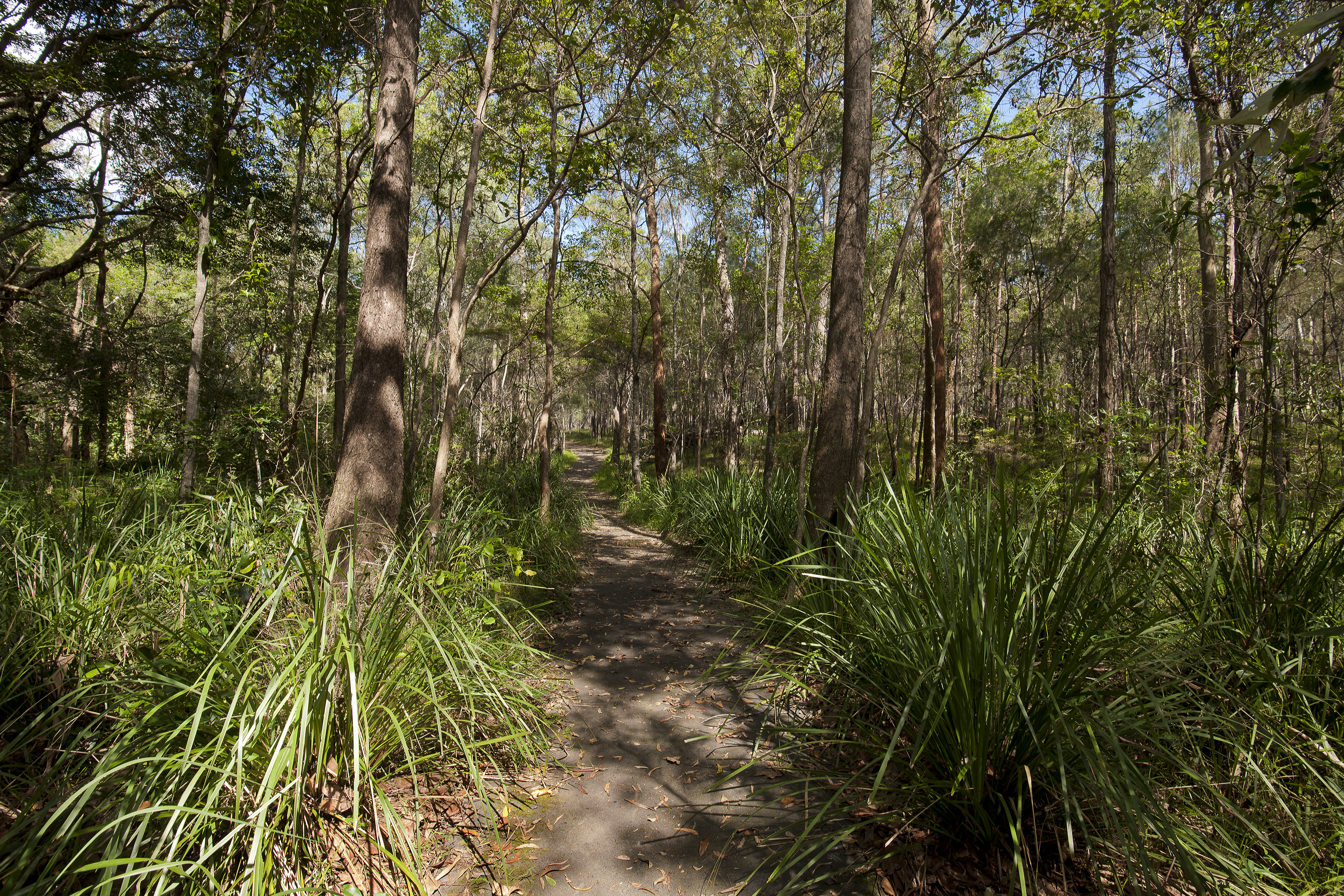
Brisbane Koala Bushlands, 2012

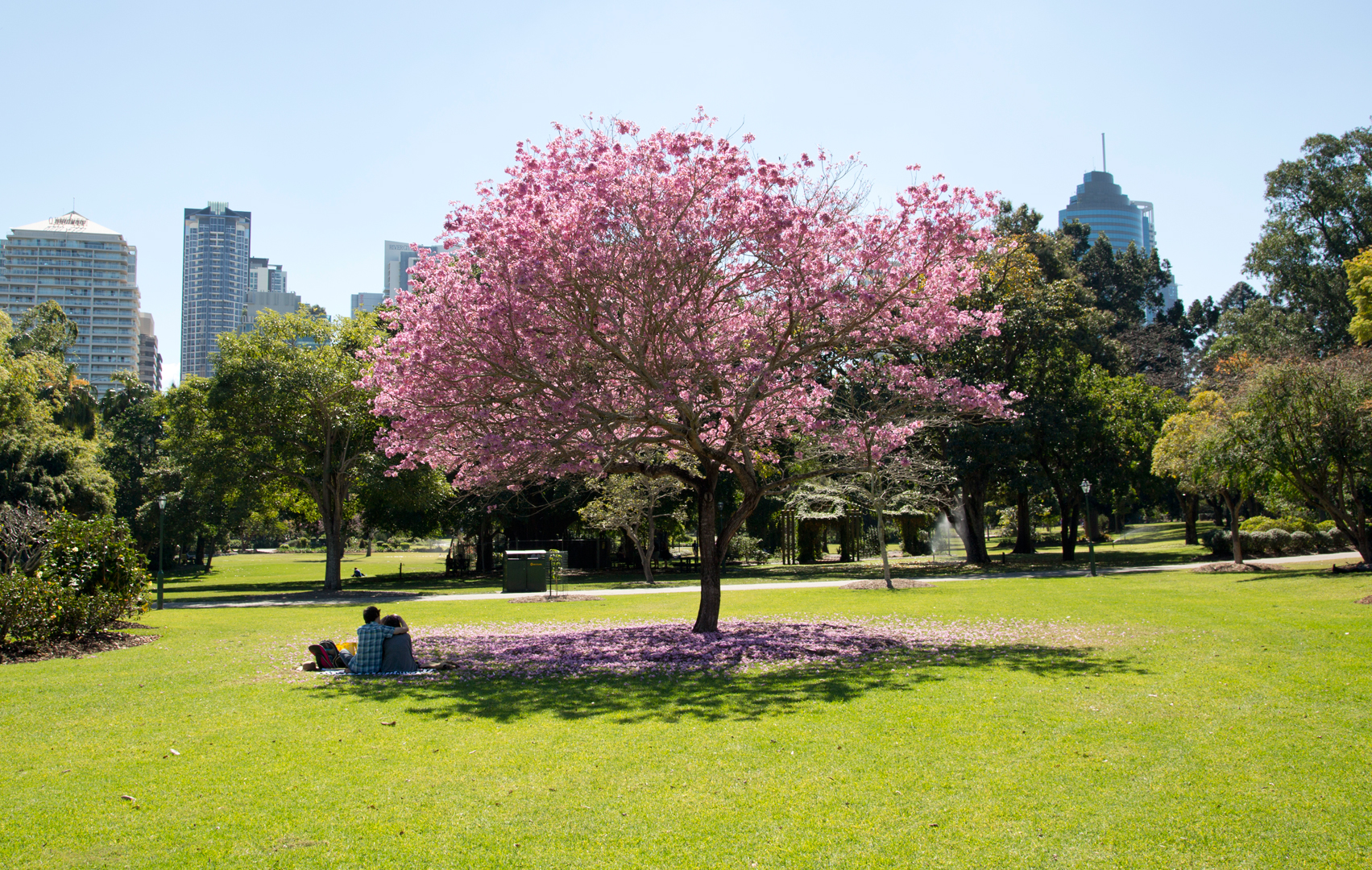
City Botanic Gardens, 2014

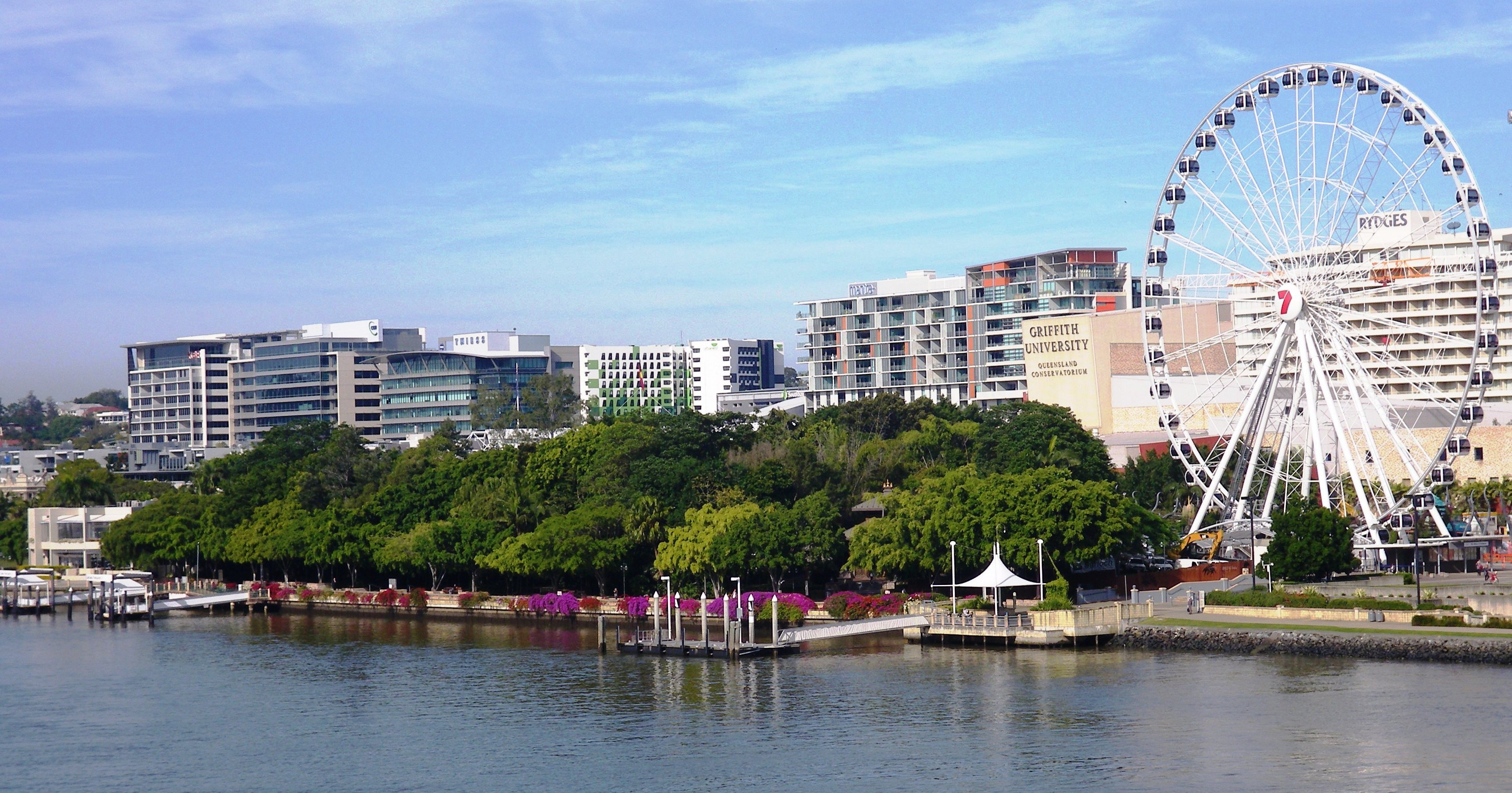
South Bank Parklands, 2010

Name	Suburb	Established	Area
ANZAC Square	CBD	1930	5,000m²
Boondall Wetlands	Boondall	1993	15 km^{2}
Bowen Park	Bowen Hills	1863	17,740m²
Brisbane Botanic Gardens	Mount Coot-tha	1970	520,000m²
Brisbane Koala Bushlands	Burbank	1992	
City Botanic Gardens	CBD	1855	200,000m²
Hardgrave Park	Petrie Terrace		10,800m²
Kalinga Park	Clayfield	1910	196,600m²
Kianawah Park	Tingalpa		
King Edward Park	CBD		4,900m²
Mowbray Park	East Brisbane	1904	32,000m²
Musgrave Park	South Brisbane	1856	63,225m²
New Farm Park	New Farm	1914	150,000m²
Newstead Park	Newstead	1846	32,100m²
Post Office Square	CBD	1984	3,300m²
Queens Gardens	CBD	1963	
Raymond Park, Brisbane	Kangaroo Point	1913	~ 24,281m²
Rocks Riverside Park	Seventeen Mile Rocks	2003	260,000m²
Roma Street Parkland	CBD	2001	160,000m²
South Bank Parklands	South Brisbane	1992	175,000m²
Whites Hill	Holland Park	1934	1.7 km^{2}
Wickham Park	CBD, Spring Hill		19,100m²
Yeronga Memorial Park	Yeronga	1882	224,600m²

== See also ==
- Brisbane native plants
- Australia's Open Garden Scheme
- Gardening in Australia
- Heritage gardens in Australia
- Protected areas of Queensland
