= Hemmant State School =

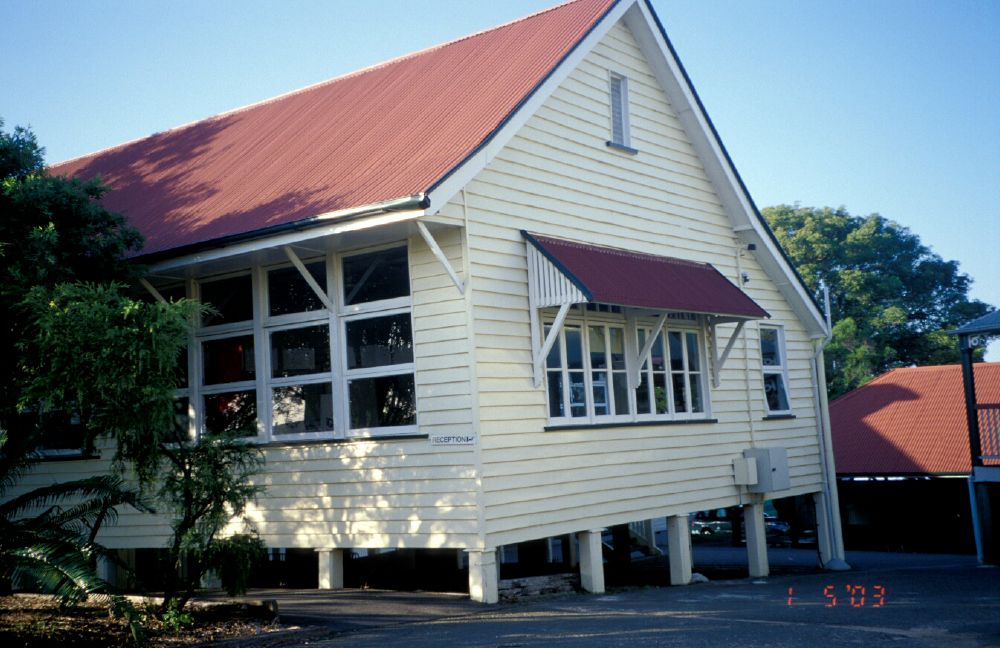
- 1876 school building

- Location within Queensland Location within Australia
- 27.4479°S 153.1271°E
- Location: 56 Hemmant–Tingalpa Road, Hemmant, City of Brisbane, Queensland, Australia

History
- Design period: 1870s–1890s (late 19th century)
- Built: 1876–1930s

Site notes
- Architect: Francis Drummond Greville Stanley

Queensland Heritage Register
- Official name: Hemmant State School and Dumbarton, Ashcroft House, Gibson House, Bulimba Creek School, Doughboy Creek Mixed School
- Type: state heritage (built)
- Designated: 4 September 2003
- Reference no.: 602382
- Significant period: 1870s (historical); 1870s–1930s (fabric); 1876–ongoing (social)
- Significant components: staffroom/s / teachers' room/s / teachers' retiring room/s, residential accommodation – housing, school/school room, play shed

Hemmant State School is a heritage-listed state school at 56 Hemmant–Tingalpa Road, Hemmant, City of Brisbane, Queensland, Australia. It was built from 1876 to 1930s. Its architects included Francis Drummond Greville Stanley. It was also known as Bulimba Creek School and Doughboy Creek Mixed School. On its grounds is the historic house Dumbarton, also known as Ashcroft House and Gibson House. The original Hemmant State School closed at the end of 2010, and in 2012 was replaced by the Hemmant Flexible Learning Centre, a new school targeted at students disengaged from mainstream education. The school buildings and structures were added to the Queensland Heritage Register on 4 September 2003.

== History ==
Hemmant State School was established in 1864 as the Bulimba Creek School (non-vested). It contains several generations of public works buildings that were built as the community at Hemmant expanded and developed. The oldest remaining building was erected in 1876, to a design by Queensland Colonial Architect, Francis Drummond Greville Stanley. The Playshed was added in 1884. The house known as Dumbarton, which was relocated from another Hemmant location to the school site in 2001, was built probably in the 1870s or early 1880s and local opinion attributes its construction and occupation to the Uhlmann and Gibson families. The Uhlman family was significant in the area as local butchers, milkmen and storekeepers, while the Gilson family were significant in the development of the sugar industry in Queensland.

Hemmant was originally known as Doughboy Creek and the first land sales took place in 1858. Non-indigenous settlement in the area commenced the following year when the Franklin and Popham families migrated in the same ship and took up adjacent pieces of land at Hemmant. English, Scottish, Dutch and German migrants followed and established farms. The soil was easy to clear and fertile, and the first crops were vegetables and fruit, which were transported up the river to Brisbane until the construction of the bridge over Bulimba Creek in 1870 made road transport possible.

In 1863 William Gibson and his son Angus arrived in Moreton Bay and settled at Hemmant. The remainder of the family followed in 1864. In 1866 William Gibson obtained cane cuttings from Louis Hope at Ormiston, which he planted at Hemmant, on a farm he called Clydesdale. Other farmers in the district also switched to sugar production. In 1868 William Gibson and Sons established the Clydesdale Sugar Mill, and by 1871 there were seven mills in the area. In the second half of the 1870s, however, drought and disease destroyed the crops repeatedly and sugar farming was moved further north. In 1883, the Clydesdale Mill was sold and the Gibson family began the move to Bingera at Bundaberg. The mill closed down the following year, and Hemmant returned to vegetable and dairy production.

Hemmant State School was opened on 9 May 1864 as Bulimba Creek School on a two-acre site. It was a non-vested school; the Department of Public Instruction supplied the teacher, Frederick Ffoulkes Swanwick, and the parents paid for the construction of the school, a shingled, weatherboard building, 15 by 30 feet (4.6 by 9.1 m). Eighteen children enrolled during the first week and 74 by the following year, although the average attendance was only 32. By 1866 three classes were required. In 1866 the name was changed to Doughboy Creek Mixed School, to avoid confusion with the newly established Bulimba State School. It then became the Doughboy Creek Primary School (1869), Doughboy Primary School (1870) and Hemmant Primary School (1876). In 1873 a new teacher's residence was built.

Complaints by the teacher and parents about the condition of the school, which had been built entirely of pine and was now a dangerous, white ant-eaten shell, resulted in a detailed inspection by David Ewart in 1876. He recommended that a new school be built, with the residents again contributing to its construction. The building was a standard Public Works school design (Burmester, Pullar & Kennedy 1996 classification: B/T2), 40 by 20 feet (12.2 by 6.1 m) with 8-foot (2.4 m) verandahs on both front and back, designed by Francis Drummond Greville Stanley, the Colonial Architect. In 1884, a large open playshed was built to another standard Public Works design (Burmester, Pullar & Kennedy 1996 classification: B/T5). In 1897 the shingles on the school building were replaced with iron and in 1899 two new rooms and other improvements were made to the teacher's residence. In 1889, 5.3 perches (130 m^{2}) were transferred to the Railway Department to enable the construction of the Cleveland railway line, and in 1912 the Headteacher's residence was moved to the north of the railway line and more land was resumed to make an island platform closer to Hemmant Village. During the flood of 1893, much of Hemmant was submerged, including a popular tourist attraction known as The Aquarium. During the flood the men took refuge in the school while women and children were lodged in nearby buildings.

An open-air annexe (Burmester, Pullar & Kennedy 1996 classification: C/T9), 32 feet 6 inches (9.91 m) by 25 feet (7.6 m) with 10-foot (3.0 m) verandahs on two sides, was built by AG Temperley for £439/16/8 in 1915. It was equipped with canvas blinds to offer some protection from the weather. This was built with its front verandah adjoining and connected to the rear verandah of the existing building. In 1922 sash windows were installed to replace the blinds and the building was enclosed. In 1931 Mr AC Weedon was contracted to improve the residence, construct a teachers' room and install new earth closets for £152/0/0. The Teachers' Room was built on the front of the verandah of the previously open-air annexe. In 1939 the school residence was sold and a tennis court built on the site. An additional 5 acres (2.0 ha) 3 roods 29.6 perches (3,780 m^{2}) which adjoined the original school site was added to the school in 1951 to make a total of 7 acres (2.8 ha) 3 roods 0.4 perches (3,050 m^{2}). In 1955 the schoolrooms were remodelled and a new classroom was built at the rear of the previous annexe. In 1961 major remodelling and additions took place at a cost of £55,000. Major changes which took place in these 1955 and 1961 remodellings included enclosing the verandahs, removing the front verandah of the original school, and dividing its large classroom into two. In 1980 the preschool was opened and in 1988 the tennis courts were cleared.

In 2001 a nearby house now known as Dumbarton was moved from 41 Hemmant-Tingalpa Rd, corner of Brand Street, onto the school site. Dumbarton was associated with the development of Hemmant as a farming community in the last quarter of the 19th century. Its original site was part of a 29-acre property alienated from the Crown by Friedrich Uhlmann and F Harz in 1859. In 1869 the land was subdivided and the Dumbarton site was transferred to Friedrich Uhlmann. In 1873 this land was further subdivided and one acre (including the Dumbarton site) was transferred to the Doughboy Sugar Company. In 1880 a mortgage was taken out against the property, possibly for improvements, which may have included construction of the house. In 1885 title to this property was transferred to Angus Gibson, then to Christof Uhlmann in 1888, thus returning to the Uhlmann family.

The Gibson and Uhlmann families were connected by marriage, William Gibson's daughter Margaret having married Frederick Uhlmann's son Christopher Frederick in 1876. Local sources, and descendants of the Gibson family claim that the house was built by Friedrich Uhlmann for the Gibson family, possibly as early as 1864. The first definite evidence of the house is in 1887, when it is marked on a Railways survey of the proposed route of the Cleveland railway line. In 1911 the house and land were bought by Henry Skiller who lived there until his death in 1955 when it was transferred to Alan Skinner, subdivided and sold to William and Elizabeth Ashcroft. The house fell into disrepair but was renovated in the 1990s.

In 2000 the Main Roads Department acquired the land to build a new road to the Port of Brisbane. Following representation from local residents, members of the Gibson and Uhlmann families and local historical organisations, the house was moved to the Hemmant State School site in April 2001. The name "Dumbarton" has been applied to the house only recently. Previously it was known as the Gibson House or the Ashcroft House. "Dumbarton" was named after the original home in Scotland of the Ashcroft family.

Hemmant State School closed on 31 December 2010. In 2012, the site reopened as the Hemmant Flexible Learning Centre, a new school targeted at students disengaged from mainstream education.

== Description ==
Hemmant State School is situated on a four-hectare site facing Hemmant-Tingalpa Road. The school uses only the northern third of the block. The remainder is separated by a fence and provides grazing for horses. The occupied portion is roughly equivalent to the original two acre site. The site slopes west/east and is partially levelled with a retaining wall above the playground. All principal area of heritage significance on this site is to the west, i.e. above, this retaining wall. This area includes the 1876 school, the 1915 open-air annexe and its extension, the 1931 teachers' room, the 1884 playshed, and Dumbarton House. These buildings and structures are arranged around a bitumened play area. To the west of the playshed is the toilet block, which is relatively recent and not of significance. To the east of the retaining wall and not included in the heritage register listing are the preschool, playground and shade cover, tennis courts and shelter sheds, a shade house, and three sheds.

The 1876 school is the building closest to Hemmant–Tingalpa Road. It is an asymmetrical, low-set, rectangular, timber-framed structure, 8.5 by 12 metres (28 by 39 ft), which has been divided into two classrooms. An enclosed verandah extends along the western side and into a walkway to the other school buildings. The walls are weatherboard except on the eastern wall where it is weatherboard on the southern section with more recent aluminium siding for the remainder. The stumps are concrete and the floor timber, although internally it is covered with carpet and linoleum. The roof is corrugated iron, slightly hipped and broader on the eastern side to cover the enclosed verandah section. The roof is straight on the western side but protrudes beyond the line of the building to shade the windows. There are two whirlybirds on the verandah portion of the roof. Each classroom has four banks of three hopper windows on the western side. On the southern wall there is a row of four casement windows topped by hoppers and protected by an awning in the classroom, and a hopper window on the enclosed verandah section. There is also a ventilation window into the ceiling space in the southern wall. On the eastern wall there are aluminium framed sliding windows above the aluminium cladding sections of the wall. Access to the building is via a parallel staircase, railed and posted, on the eastern wall, which leads to a landing which goes to an ante-room on the enclosed verandah. Internally the walls are primarily tongue and groove, vertically jointed boards, with fibrous cement ceilings, flat in the classroom and sloped in the verandah. The classrooms are divided by a wall with a sloping blackboard and white board on either side of French doors. Cupboards run under the black/white boards. The northern end of the enclosed verandah has a stove and sink fitted on the eastern wall. The northern end of the verandah leads to an enclosed walkway through to the other school buildings.

The 1915 open-air annexe and its extension are to the north of the 1876 school building. It has been modified and extended. It is a highset timber building, approximately 21.5 by 11 metres (71 by 36 ft), with concrete stumps, partially enclosed under. The roof is corrugated iron and has two ventilators on the southern portion. To the north and west it is hipped to accommodate now enclosed verandahs. The external walls are clad with chamferboards except on the walkway from the other buildings, which is weatherboard, and the enclosed northern verandah section, which is clad with aluminium siding. Above the aluminium are aluminium framed sliding windows. Access to the building is via the walkway from the 1876 school building, perpendicular stairs from the west, and stairs on the northern side. Internally the building is divided into nine sections. On the western section there is an enclosed verandah which has been converted into a computer room. This room is lined with fibrous cement sheeting and has a timber, tongue and groove ceiling. There is access to the walkway from the 1876 school building and from the teachers' room. Double timber doors lead onto the front steps and there is a double hopper window adjoining. An arch leads into a small room, which, with its neighbour, has been divided from the original open-air annexe classroom. Each has a false ceiling. The southern one has a pair of double casement windows, each topped by a hopper. A door leads into the original annexe schoolroom. This is a large (7200 by 7700) room with tongue and groove timber walls and a pressed metal ceiling, flat in the middle and sloped towards the sides and ends. The western end of the ceiling is obscured by the false ceilings in the adjoining subdivided rooms. There are metal stringers between the walls. Three sets of the windows consisting of a double casement topped by a hopper are on the southern wall. A large archway leads onto the enclosed northern verandah.

East of this is another large classroom, 6210 by 7700, with board lining. Five triple hopper windows cover the whole of the upper part of the southern wall and the northern wall is occupied by a door and louvres onto the enclosed verandah. The verandah runs most of the length of the building with tongue and groove vertically jointed walls onto the classrooms and a tongue and groove sloping ceiling. It is 3,100 millimetres (120 in) wide along the original annexe room and then splits to 1,900 millimetres (75 in) while the remainder is occupied by a stairway. At the eastern end of the building are three small offices. Two continue the line of the original walls and are fitted with casement windows topped by hoppers. The third continues the verandah and has aluminium framed sliding windows. The sub-floor is partially enclosed and the remainder is concreted or bitumened and fitted with fixed timber seats between the stumps. The land slopes and the area is divided by a small retaining wall with steps across it. The western end is enclosed with corrugated iron into a storage room and the eastern end is enclosed with chamferboards to form a tuckshop and small additional room. The tuckshop has three sets of double casement windows on the eastern end. There are tin and chamferboard walls along some sections of the southern wall and a drinking trough and bubblers along one.

The other teaching building is the 1931 teachers' room, which is to the north of the 1876 school building and to the west of the 1915 open-air annexe. It adjoins the latter and is connected to it by a doorway onto the western verandah. It is a small, lowset weatherboard building with casement windows with awnings on all three exposed sides. Internally walls and ceiling are lined with tongue and groove vertically jointed timber boards. The 1884 playshed is on the eastern side of the bitumened area. It is an open timber-framed structure, 12,550 by 7,200 millimetres (494 by 283 in). The roof is corrugated iron supported by timber posts with angled bracing. It is partially enclosed on the eastern side with corrugated iron which has a blackboard along it. The floor is bitumen and there are fixed timber seats between the posts. Large hooks are screwed into the beams at two places.

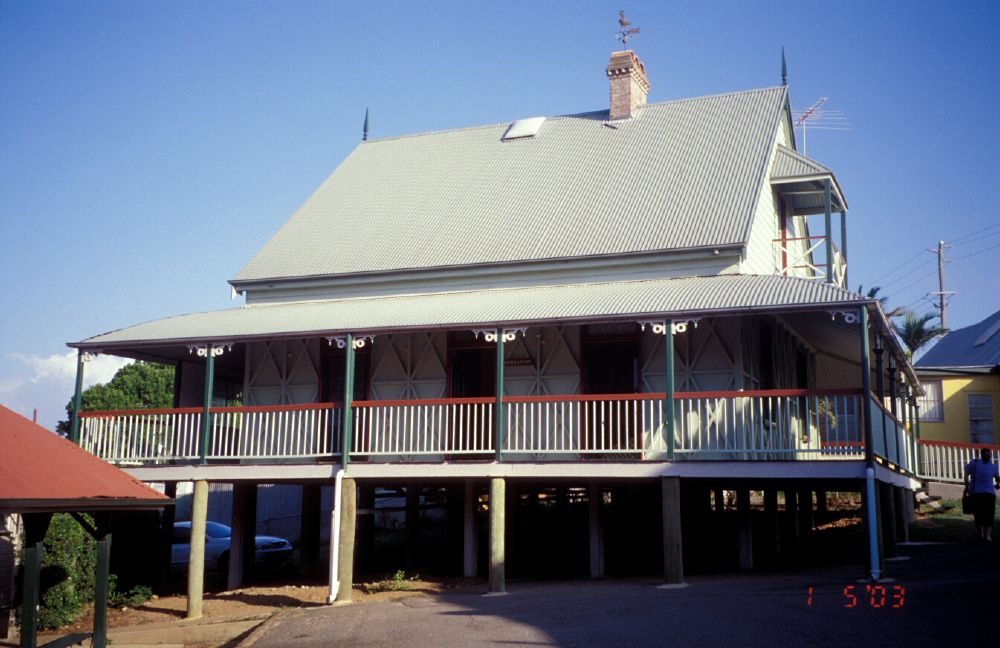
Dumbarton

Dumbarton is situated on the southern side of the school complex. It is a high-set, single-storey dwelling with exposed cross brace stud framing. It has a transverse gabled roof with colorbond sheeting, a roof light over the stairwell, finials on the gables and a weathercock on the chimney of the double fireplace. The verandah roof is curved and separate from the house. The verandah surrounds the basically square core of the house and in the southeastern portions it is enclosed with chamferboards and fibrous cement sheeting. The open portions have timber handrails and dowelled balustrading. The posts are moulded and have decorative brackets. Access to the verandah is by steps or a ramp, both recent, on the western side of the house. Another set of steps leads from the south (rear) of the house. All windows and doors onto the verandah are covered with security mesh.

Internally the house has a central hall, with rooms leading off on either side. At the front are two rooms now converted to offices. Each room has vertically jointed walls and tongue and groove ceilings, French doors leading onto the front (northern) side and a double hung window on the other external side. The room on the east has access to a small modern en-suite bathroom. The room on the right has a fireplace with timber surrounds and shelf. The next door on the left is another modern bathroom with pine ceiling and a dividing wall with leadlight through to the en suite bathroom. The hall enters a larger back room on the right with vertically jointed walls and ceiling, the second half of the double fireplace, a double hung window onto the west and French doors onto the verandah at the south. The remaining quarter of the floor is occupied by a kitchen that opens into the enclosed sections of the verandah. All the fittings are modern, including the sloping clear sealed pine tongue and groove ceiling on the verandah portion and the three double hung windows in the new section. Early double hung windows and French doors open onto the verandah, presumably from the original room. Narrow stairs lead to the attic which consists of two rooms. These are carpeted and lined with vertically jointed timber boards except on two walls which have horizontal beaded boards. The ceilings are recent with clear finished tongue and groove boards. The eastern room has two double hung sash windows with timber framed hoods. The western room has the chimney through it and leads onto a balcony with timber railings and cross balustrading. There is a recent door into the roof space at the front of the building.

== Heritage listing ==
Hemmant State School and Dumbarton was listed on the Queensland Heritage Register on 4 September 2003 having satisfied the following criteria.

The place is important in demonstrating the evolution or pattern of Queensland's history.

Hemmant State School was established in 1864 and is one of the oldest still-operating State schools in Queensland. The earliest surviving building on the site dates to 1876. The school is important in illustrating the pattern of Queensland history. Established shortly after the subdivision of the Doughboy Creek area into farms, the school illustrates the expansion of agriculture (initially small cropping and dairying) on the outskirts of Brisbane during the late 1850s and 1860s, during the period when Brisbane was consolidating its position as the principal town and capital of Queensland. In the 1870s the school population expanded with the introduction of sugar cultivation into the Doughboy Creek area, and expanded again in the 1920s and 1930s when meatworks were established in adjoining suburbs, employing Hemmant residents.

The place demonstrates rare, uncommon or endangered aspects of Queensland's cultural heritage.

Hemmant State School was established in 1864 and is one of the oldest still-operating State schools in Queensland.

The place is important in demonstrating the principal characteristics of a particular class of cultural places.

The Hemmant State School group comprises school buildings from the 1870s, 1880s, 1910s and 1930s and are significant in representing changing trends in school architecture, which were themselves representative of developments in education policy and practices. The 1876 building is considerably modified but a rare survival. The 1884 playshed is intact, including hooks which may have been used for hanging gym equipment, and relatively rare. The 1915 open-air annexe is considerably modified but many of the modifications are cosmetic and reversible. Major changes, such as the addition of another classroom and the substitution of windows for canvas blinds, are themselves representative of changes in the school population and education policies and practices.

Dumbarton, although considerably modified, provides evidence of c. 1880 single-skin and cross-bracing construction and is one of few remaining buildings in the Hemmant area which illustrates domestic architectural style and form of its era.

The place has a strong or special association with a particular community or cultural group for social, cultural or spiritual reasons.

Hemmant State School has a particular significance for the people of the small rural community of Hemmant. The school developed as the district grew and was a meeting place and community centre for many years.

Like Hemmant State School, it has strong community importance. When it was threatened with demolition in 2000, local action resulted in government intercession and the removal of the house to the local school site.

The place has a special association with the life or work of a particular person, group or organisation of importance in Queensland's history.

It is also associated with the locally prominent Gibson and Uhlmann families, who were among the first settlers in the Doughboy Creek (Hemmant) area. The Gibson family was also important in the development of the Queensland sugar industry, and Angus Gibson, who held title to Dumbarton from 1885 to 1888, was active in local government in the early 1880s and was a Member of the Queensland Legislative Council 1899–1920.
