= Queensport =

Queensport may refer to:

== Australia ==
- Queensport, Queensland
- Queensport Aquarium

== Canada ==
- Queensport, Nova Scotia
