= Ravenswood Community Church =

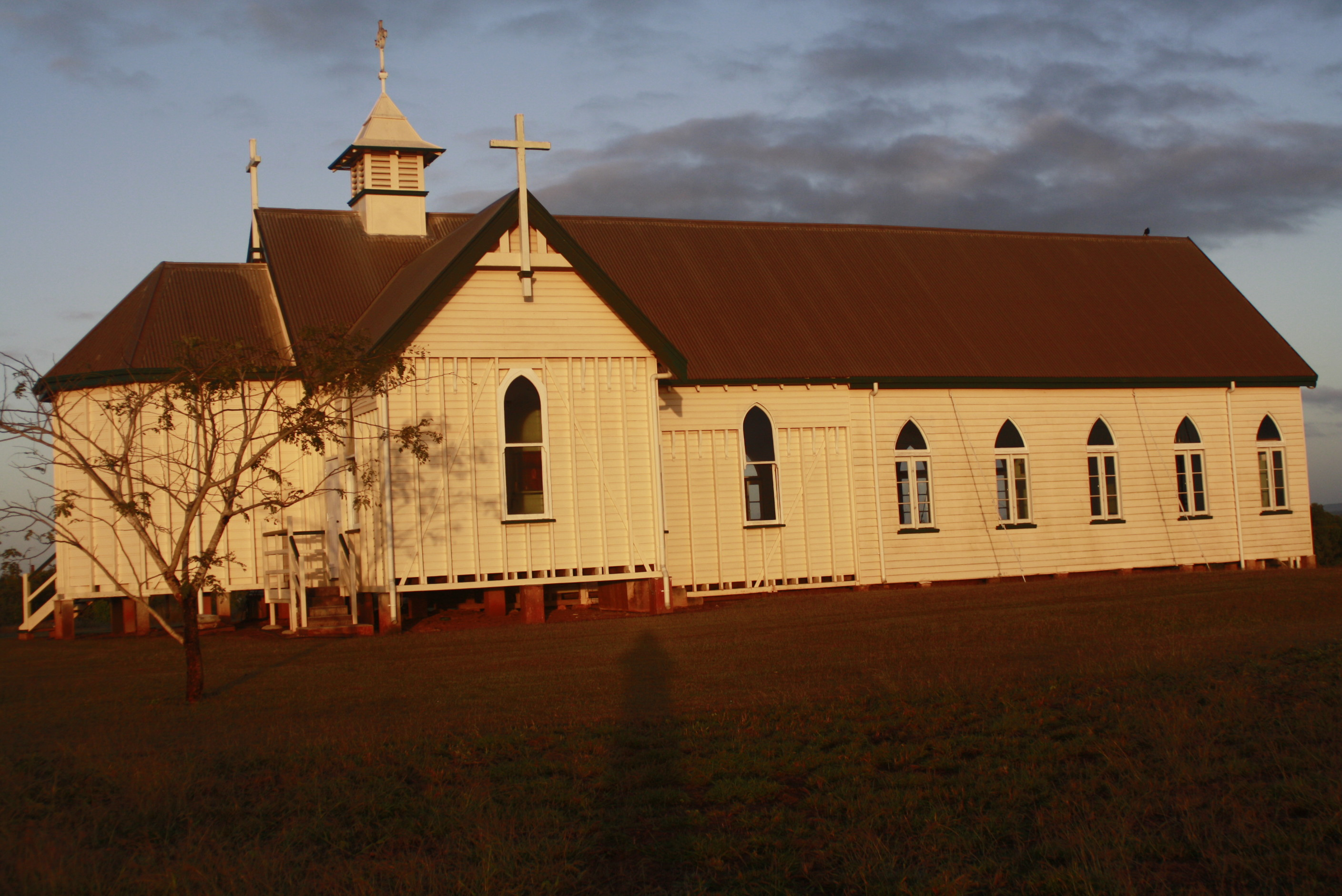
- Ravenswood Community Church, 2011
- Ravenswood Community Church
- 20°06′00″S 146°53′33″E
- Address: Chapel Street, Ravenswood, Charters Towers Region, Queensland
- Country: Australia
- Denomination: Union Church (since c. 1985)
- Previous denomination: Roman Catholic (1871–c. 1985)

History
- Former name: St Patrick's Catholic Church
- Status: Church
- Founded: 21 October 1871

Architecture
- Functional status: Active
- Architectural type: Church
- Style: Gothic Revival
- Completed: 1871

Queensland Heritage Register
- Official name: Ravenswood Community Church, St Patrick's Catholic Church
- Type: state heritage (landscape, built)
- Designated: 24 September 1999
- Reference no.: 601829
- Significant period: 1870s (historical); 1870s, 1900s (fabric) ongoing (social)
- Significant components: views to, furniture/fittings, church, garden/grounds
- Builders: Ross & O'Reilly

Ravenswood Community Church is a heritage-listed former Roman Catholic church and now union church at Chapel Street, Ravenswood, Charters Towers Region, Queensland, Australia. It was built in 1871 by Ross & O'Reilly. It is also known as St Patrick's Catholic Church. It was added to the Queensland Heritage Register on 24 September 1999.

== History ==
Ravenswood Community Church, formerly St Patrick's Catholic Church, was opened on 21 October 1871. Additions have been made to the church over time and it is understood that major additions were made to the building in the early 20th century.

Early discoveries of gold in the Ravenswood area were made by prospectors attracted to the district by gold mining at Cape River. Gold was discovered in the Ravenswood district in 1868 although the Top Camp Lode was not discovered until the following year.

Ravenswood was initially an alluvial field with some quartz reefing. Following the discovery of quartz reefs there were problems with attracting crushing machinery. The arrival of a five head stamp battery in 1869, led to a subsequent improvement in returns from the quartz reefs providing the miners with the impetus to develop a more permanent township.

By the mid 1870s, the population was fairly stable. There were a number of service industries established including five hotels, saddler, blacksmiths, chemist, baker, assayer, and butcher. auctioneer, a variety of stores from fancy goods to wholesalers.

About March 1871 a committee was formed to plan the construction of a Catholic chapel. A subscription list was opened and donations acknowledged in the Ravenswood Miner. The construction of the church appears to have been a community affair with people from many denominations donating to the project or helping with construction. A small school was opened in the chapel soon after construction was completed.

Ross & O'Reilly who are believed to have been local builders constructed the building. Hugh Ross was identified as a builder in Charters Towers in 1875 where he constructed Acker & Company's building, the Oddfellows' Hall and the Anglican and Presbyterian churches. These churches are similar in design to the Ravenswood Community Church.

A severe storm in 1873 damaged the church although it is not known how severely. One local story says that the rear of the building had to be rebuilt while another says that the whole building was demolished and required rebuilding.

The Ravenswood Catholic community became a thriving one with a church, boarding school and convent located in Chapel Street. Fr JPF Connolly, from Townsville, was the first visiting priest to Ravenswood. Later, missionary priests from Italy and France visited the town before it became a parish in its own right.

In 1885 Fr Flood, first parish priest, began negotiations with the Sisters of Mercy to open a school and convent. The Ravenswood community again demonstrated their faith in the long term prosperity of their town by supporting Fr Flood's fundraising campaign. Fr Flood purchased a house for the nuns who arrived in 1886. The first convent school was probably opened in the church. And later a day and boarding school for girls was opened in 1890.

During the second world war students from St Patrick's College, The Strand, Townsville were evacuated to the boarding school at Ravenswood. After the war St Patrick's students returned to Townsville. The boarding school and convent remained in operation until 1948 when both were closed.

The school building was moved to Giru but the convent remained in situ until damaged in a storm and demolished by local residents for its timber.

Townsville builders Rooney & Company are thought to be the contractors who extended the church in 1905. The church continued to be used, although it was allowed to fall into disrepair, until 1957 when a community fundraising campaign raised £50 for repairs. Community working bees renewed the wall behind the sanctuary after it was damaged by white ants, the roof was renewed where necessary, and the white ant-damaged sacristy was demolished and reconstructed. The structure was then painted.

Despite this community activity the building was under-utilised and neglected until the mid 1970s when a local couple chose to be married there. Once again the community responded with working bees to repair the building in time for the wedding. Windows were replaced, the structure was painted, fittings were repaired and carpet laid in the aisle.

In the mid 1980s the Roman Catholic Diocese of Townsville handed over the property to the Dalrymple Shire (now amalgamated into Charters Towers Region). Since that time the Ravenswood community, assisted with funds from local mining company Carpentaria Gold, has maintained its long association with the church by acting as caretakers of the building and by utilising the place as a community church. Special events such as carols by candle light, which involve the whole community, are also celebrated in the church.

The structure has recently been repainted and the stairs to the choir loft rebuilt.

== Description ==
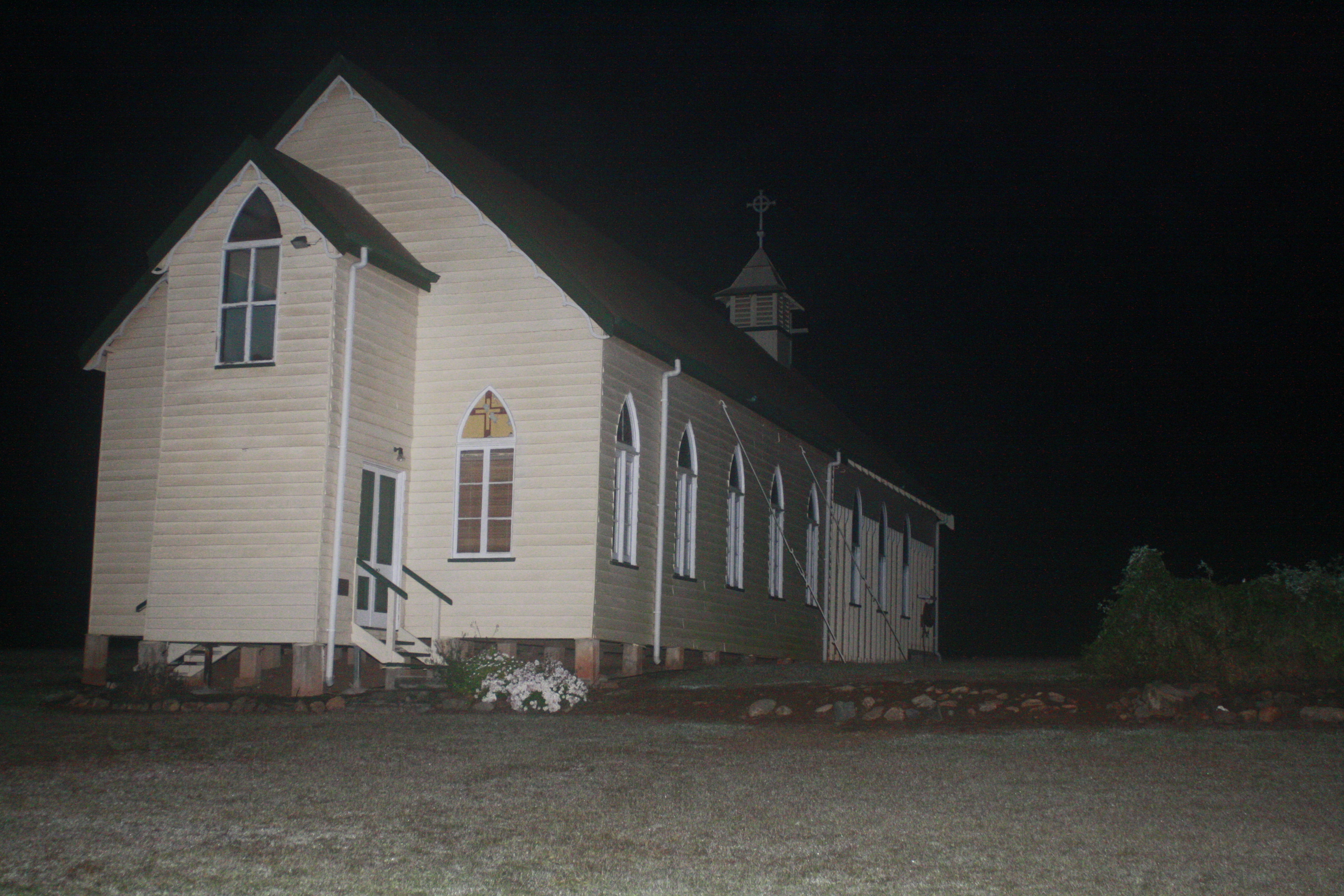
Church at night, 2011

The Ravenswood Community Church is a rectangular planned building with a gabled corrugated iron roof. It is located south east of the town on a cleared rise facing Chapel Street.

On the western side of the building are remnant plantings and building material from the Mercy Convent, which was located next door. A brick entrance is located down the slope at the Chapel Street entrance to the site.

The front section of the building is clad with chamferboard while the rear has a single skin of chamferboard with exposed framing. Projecting from the nave is an entry porch, which faces Chapel Street. There are narrow windows either side of the porch and in the front wall of the porch. Similar windows are found along both sides of the structure.

A curved projection at the rear of the building marks the sanctuary. A sacristy and a similar extension are located on either side of the sanctuary.

The internal fittings include pews, timber and marble altar, baptismal font and confessional. The interior has been painted and fittings repaired. A new staircase to the choir loft has been recently constructed and windows replaced with new frames.

== Heritage listing ==
Ravenswood Community Church was listed on the Queensland Heritage Register on 24 September 1999 having satisfied the following criteria.

The place is important in demonstrating the evolution or pattern of Queensland's history.

Ravenswood Community Church, constructed in stages from 1871 by Charters Towers builders, Ross and O'Reilly, is important in demonstrating the periods of prosperity of the Ravenswood gold fields and is evidence of the spread of the Catholic religion in regional Queensland particularly North Queensland.

The place is important because of its aesthetic significance.

The church, which is a simply constructed timber building overlooking the town, is a landmark in Ravenswood.

The place has a strong or special association with a particular community or cultural group for social, cultural or spiritual reasons.

The local community has had a long association with the church. On a number of occasions the survival of the church has depended on the concern and generosity of the Ravenswood community which has provided ongoing care and maintenance on the building since the 1950s. As a community church the building continues to be a focus for community gatherings, church services and celebrations.
