= Hemmant Gun Battery =

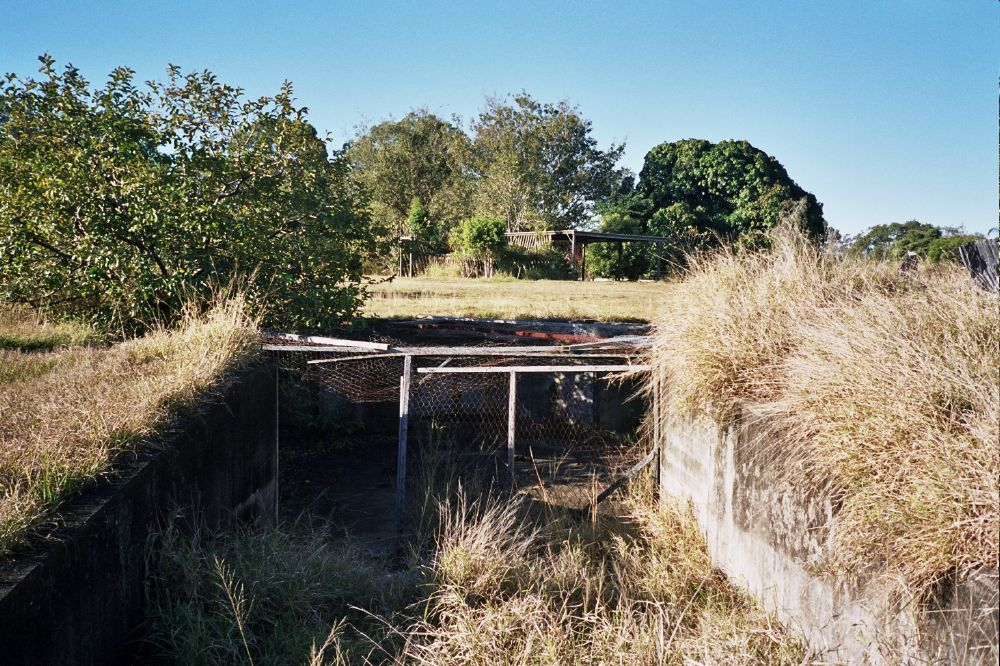
- Hemmant Gun Battery, 2006

- Location within Queensland Location within Australia
- 27.4644°S 153.1312°E
- Location: 214, 228 and 274 Fleming Road, Hemmant, City of Brisbane, Queensland, Australia

History
- Design period: 1939 - 1945 (World War II)
- Built: 1942

Queensland Heritage Register
- Official name: 6 (390) Australian Anti-Aircraft Battery, 390 Heavy Anti-Aircraft Gun Station Class A, Hemmant Gun Emplacements
- Type: state heritage (built)
- Designated: 26 May 2000
- Reference no.: 601353
- Significant period: 1942 (fabric); 1942-1945 (historical)
- Significant components: gun emplacement, command post, magazine / explosives store

The Hemmant Gun Battery is a heritage-listed fortification at 214, 228 and 274 Fleming Road, Hemmant, City of Brisbane, Queensland, Australia. It was built during 1942. It is also known as the Hemmant Gun Emplacements and 6 (390) Australian Anti-Aircraft Battery and 390 Heavy Anti-Aircraft Gun Station Class A. It was added to the Queensland Heritage Register on 26 May 2000.

== History ==
The Hemmant Gun Battery was constructed c. 1942 as part of the defence facilities of Brisbane.

The Hemmant Gun Battery was part of a series of "A class" (four gun) defensive positions constructed in an effort to monitor aircraft entering Brisbane airspace during World War II. Others included Colmslie (385), Balmoral (387), Amberley (391) and Archerfield (392). They were built to provide protection to nearby Australian and US naval facilities located along the Brisbane River at Hamilton and Eagle Farm, as well as providing cover for nearby Brisbane airfield. The sighting of gun stations near the Brisbane River also had strategic importance as enemy aircraft would use the river as a navigational aid when conducting reconnaissance.

When the Japanese bombed Pearl Harbor on 7 December 1941, Australia's focus in the war turned to the Pacific Ocean. After the bombing of Darwin in February 1942, many felt that as Brisbane was the largest city in Queensland, it could possibly be the next to experience a large scale raid by the Japanese. Brisbane was already designated as a staging point, with a significant US buildup underway and the best port facilities in Queensland. Due to Brisbane's distance from the front line, it could not be raided by land-based bombers however, which had added to the devastation in Darwin. Thus any bombing attack would come from aircraft carriers or long range flying boats refuelled by submarines. Between March and July the Japanese conducted regular reconnaissance missions over Cairns and Townsville using long range twin-engined aircraft. Townsville was actually bombed three times in late July, and the town of Mossman once. During the Townsville raids, A Class stations of 16 HAA (X and Y Batteries) fired on raiding Kawanishi flying boats. While the Japanese were able to penetrate Australia's defences on these occasions, the May Battle of the Coral Sea prevented Japan from completing its objective of achieving large scale carrier based raids along the Queensland coast.

Although Brisbane was never bombed, reconnaissance missions, such as those from submarine based floatplanes or long range flying boats are likely to have occurred. Similar missions were conducted and have been documented over east coast towns from Cairns to Hobart. Sightings and unit records of aircraft capable "I" class submarines in deep water passages near Bribie and Moreton Islands have been recorded, and it is highly likely that similar intelligence gathering missions occurred over Brisbane. The site was manned by both AWAS (Australian Women's Army Service) and VDC (Volunteer Defence Corps) personnel from mid 1943, and these arrangements remained in place until August 1945 when all of the HAA sites were disarmed.

In 1942 the Commonwealth Government requisitioned an area of land in the quiet farming community of Hemmant. Known as a class A gun station, 6 (390) Australian HAA originally contained four 3.7-inch (94 mm) autofrettaged type guns, manufactured in Australia. The 3.7-inch (94 mm) anti-aircraft gun was developed shortly before World War Two and was the standard medium anti-aircraft gun for the British Army from 1938 to 1956. Effective range was around 9,100 metres (29,900 ft). The octagonally shaped emplacements with surrounding magazine/store rooms originally housed a sandbagged entry point with more bags placed on the magazine roof. Rooms contained rifle racks and anti gas equipment, 280 rounds of ammunition for the AA gun and canvas flap doors for the perimeter entrances. Hidden from aerial view, four separate underground magazines provided cool storage for high explosive rounds.

The guns were controlled by a centrally located command post/plotting room. Sightings of suspicious aircraft were relayed to the post for action by Fighter Sector Headquarters which was in turn in communication with observer units. Within the command post were pits for a height finder and predictor. Each gun had to be in sight of the height predictor, which could be no more than 10 feet (3.0 m) above or below any gun. Further displacement caused errors, as the predictor could only solve deflection (angle). To find the height of an aircraft, a separate height finder had to be used. A kitchen, showers, latrines and three sleeping quarters were located to the northern extremity of the site next to Hemmant road. It is likely that these structures were prefabricated facilities. No evidence of these buildings remains. One of the four magazines constructed as part of the battery has also been demolished in the years since the end of the war.

== Description ==
The former Hemmant Gun Battery is situated along Fleming Road on the peak of Hemmant hill. The Brisbane CBD is visible to the north-west of the site.

The anti-aircraft battery consists of three separate underground ammunition magazines, four gun platforms and a semi-underground command post/plotting room, all constructed of reinforced concrete. The three separate magazines are of identical size, single-roomed, underground and show evidence of a ventilator. The noticeable drop in temperature on entering the structures illustrates the designers awareness of local conditions, and storage of highly explosive material in a sub tropical climate. All magazines and the command post/plotting room have had their steel doors removed.

Three of the four gun emplacements are visible, the fourth partially buried and built upon. The structures are octagonally shaped and surrounded by magazine/store rooms. The most visible example has been converted into a chicken pen. Two drains are located in the floor of the structure with holdfast points for the guns remaining. The second remains intact but has a private dwelling placed on top, and is used as a garage and storage area. The third emplacement has been filled with water and converted to a pool. All three (and presumably the fourth) have the encircling magazine/storage rooms intact. The command post/plotting room is structurally intact and has recently been converted into a gazebo and fernery.

The former Hemmant Gun Battery is the best preserved example of a Class A Gun Station in south east Queensland. It is also the last in the five station group that served Brisbane.

== Heritage listing ==
6 (390) Australian Anti-Aircraft Battery was listed on the Queensland Heritage Register on 26 May 2000 having satisfied the following criteria.

The place is important in demonstrating the evolution or pattern of Queensland's history.

6 (390) Aust HAA Hemmant is important in demonstrating the pattern of Queensland's history as an installation designed to protect Brisbane in the event of enemy air-raids during that conflict. It was one of several anti-aircraft batteries located strategically along the Brisbane River, built to protect Australian and United States naval facilities and Brisbane airfield, and to monitor enemy reconnaissance activity.

The place demonstrates rare, uncommon or endangered aspects of Queensland's cultural heritage.

The Hemmant Battery is the only visible and substantially intact anti-aircraft battery in Brisbane, and as such demonstrates a rare aspect of Queensland's cultural heritage.

The place has potential to yield information that will contribute to an understanding of Queensland's history.

The Battery, in its siting and planning, demonstrates the measures implemented for the strategic defence of Brisbane during World War II. It is a relatively intact example of the "Brisbane Line" fortifications and has the potential to yield further information about this aspect of Queensland's history.

The place is important in demonstrating the principal characteristics of a particular class of cultural places.

The Hemmant Battery, with its extant command post, gun emplacements and magazines, and its location in a prominent position overlooking the Brisbane skyline, is important in demonstrating the principal characteristics of an Australian Heavy Anti-Aircraft Battery.

The place is important because of its aesthetic significance.

The Hemmant Battery, set among grassed lawns and paddocks in the sparsely populated suburb of Hemmant, is important because of its aesthetic significance.
