= Kianawah Park =

Coordinates: 27.477°S 153.125°E

Kianawah Park is a park located on Joe Lambert Drive Tingalpa in Queensland, Australia. The park is the oldest one in Tingalpa. The major lease holder is W.C.A.Q (Warehouse Cricket Association of Queensland) with Senior and Junior cricket competitions conducted in Summer and Winter on Saturday and Sunday. 2 day games, 50 over and T20 games available. It is home the BEARs (Brisbane East and Redlands) district cricket playing fields and also host other cricket competitions. The park includes a dog park and 11 cricket fields. The park also has a four net cricket practice area and a canteen open on Saturdays during cricket season.

== See also ==
- List of parks in Brisbane
