= Running Stream, New South Wales =

Running Stream New South Wales
- Coordinates: 33.03°S 149.90°E
- Population: 134 (2016 census)
- Postcode(s): 2850
- Location: 61 km (38 mi) northwest of Lithgow
- LGA(s): Mid-Western Regional Council; City of Lithgow
- State electorate(s): Bathurst
- Federal division(s): Calare
Localities around Running Stream:
	Ilford	Brogans Creek
Sofala	Running Stream	Bogee
Upper Turon	Palmers Oaky	Round Swamp, Capertee

Running Stream is a locality in New South Wales, Australia. It is named after the creek flowing through the area. Running Stream is accessed on the Castlereagh Highway. The bus stop near the intersection with Mount Vincent Road is serviced several times a day by buses operated by NSW TrainLink departing from Lithgow railway station towards Gulgong, New South Wales.

Running Stream has a cafe, public telephone and postbox facing the Castlereagh Highway. It has a community hall and previously had a primary school. The community today is primarily farming, however historically there have been a number of mines in the vicinity These included the Cherry Tree Hill deep lead underground gold mine operated in the 1930s and Razorback Mine operated around 1876 to 1903 and 1910.

A stone church and small cemetery off New Olivers Road have local heritage listing. The church building was St John's Union Church opened in 1906 but not presently in use. Headstones in the cemetery are dated from 1859 to 1983. the building continues to house historic records.

The bounded locality of Running Stream includes a historic locality named Cherry Tree Hill towards Ilford. The gazetted locality of Cherry Tree Hill is in a different region of New South Wales, north of Inverell.
