= Hemmant =

- Suburb
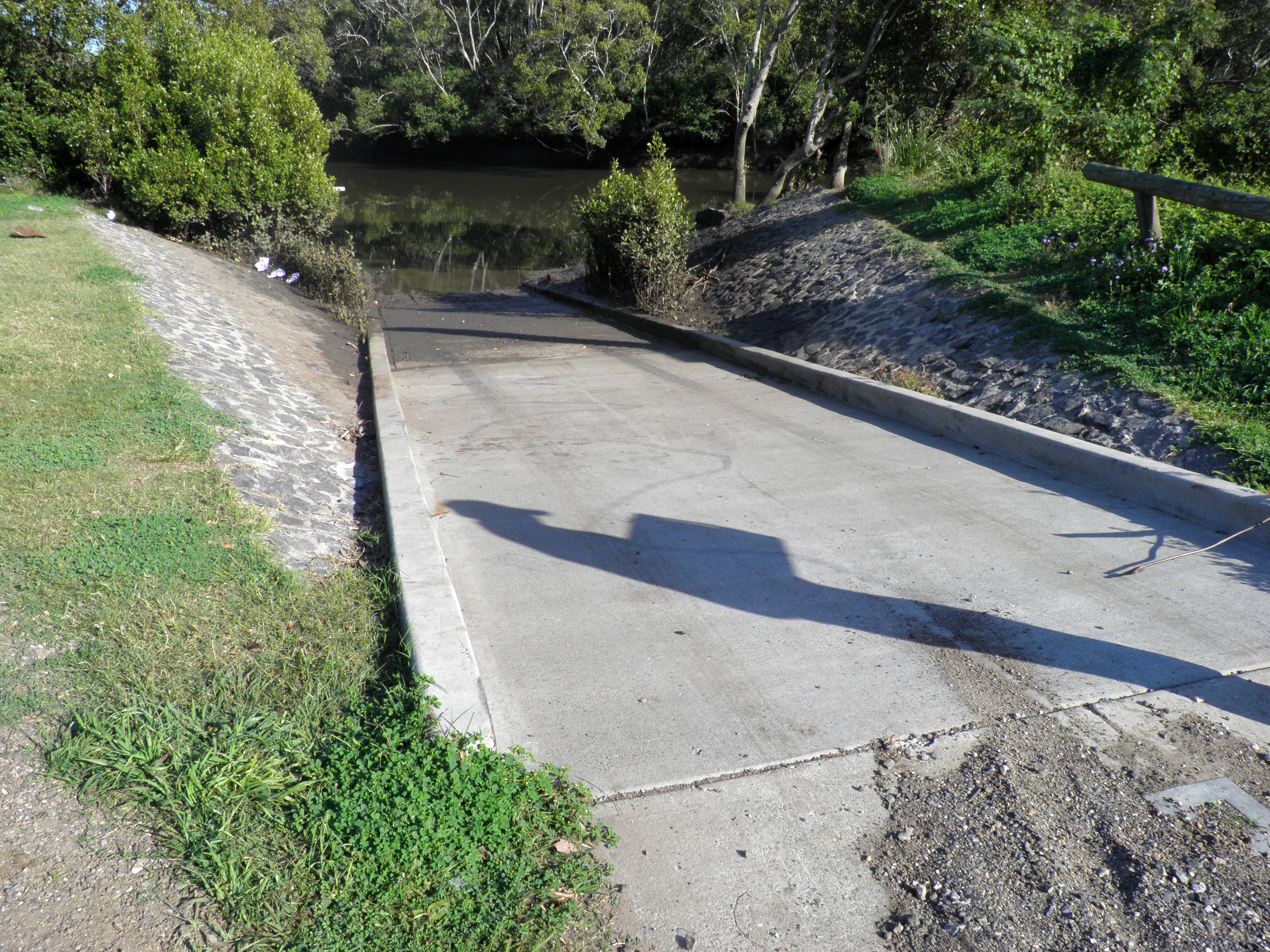
- Canoe ramp at Fleming Road Park, Hemmant

- Interactive map of Hemmant
- Coordinates: 27.4483°S 153.1302°E
- Country: Australia
- State: Queensland
- City: Brisbane
- LGA: City of Brisbane (Doboy Ward)
- Location: 17.2 km (10.7 mi) E of Brisbane CBD

Government
  - State electorate: Lytton
  - Federal division: Bonner

Area
  - Total: 6.8 km^{2} (2.6 sq mi)

Population
  - Total: 2,886 (2021 census)
  - Density: 424/km^{2} (1,099/sq mi)
- Time zone: UTC+10:00 (AEST)
- Postcode: 4174
Suburbs around Hemmant
Murarrie	Pinkenba	Lytton
Murarrie	Hemmant	Wynnum West
Murarrie	Tingalpa	Tingalpa

Hemmant is an eastern riverside suburb of the City of Brisbane, Queensland, Australia. In the 2021 census, Hemmant had a population of 2,886 people.

== Geography ==
Hemmant is 11 kilometres (6.8 mi) by road east of the Brisbane CBD.

Hemmant is bounded by the Brisbane River to the north and Bulimba Creek to the west.

The Fishermans Islands freight railway line and the Cleveland railway line run parallel through the suburb from west (Murarrie) to east (Wynnum West). The Hemmant railway station serves the suburb with passenger services on the Cleveland line (27.4473°S 153.127345°E).

The Port of Brisbane Motorway and Lytton Road both enter the suburb from the west (Murarrie) and exit to the north-west (Lytton). The destination for both routes is ultimately the Port of Brisbane.

The land north of the railway lines (where the major roads pass through) is principally used for industrial purposes influenced by the proximity of and access to the port, while south of the railway lines is mostly residential use.

== History ==
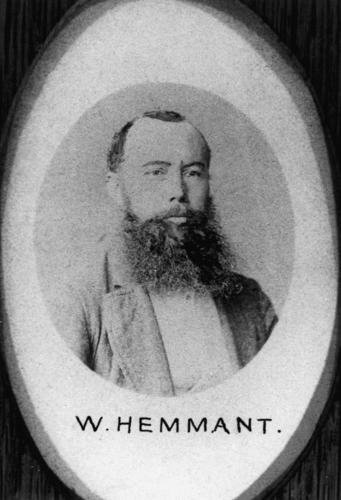
The suburb of Hemmant was named after William Hemmant.

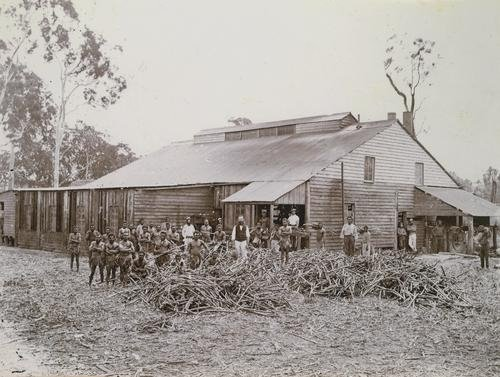
Sugar mills with South Sea Islander workers posing.

In 1858, the land of Hemmant area was sold for fruit, vegetable growing and farming in general. Early 1860s sugar cane was farmed and mills were built to process the cane. Gibsons Clydesdale mill was well known as was a co-operative mill at Murarrie in 1872.

Bulimba State School (also known as Bulimba Creek State School) opened on 8 May 1864, but was renamed Doughboy State School in 1869. in 1876 it was renamed Hemmant State School. The school closed on 31 December 2010. It was at 56 Hemmant-Tingalpa Road (27.4479°S 153.1270°E). The school's website was archived. The buildings were then reused to establish Hemmant Flexible Learning Centre. (This school is unrelated to the Bulimba State School in Bulimba).

Tingalpa Cemetery had its first burial in 1875. In 1913, it was renamed Hemmant Cemetery. Lawn cemeteries were added from 1952. In 2001, a crematorium opened at the cemetery. Despite the name change, as at 2020, it is within the boundaries of Tingalpa and not Hemmant (27.4680°S 153.1344°E).

Part of Hemmant was originally known as "Doughboy Creek" The whole district had been named after William Hemmant a local parliamentarian in 1876. He was treasurer in the Macalister government and between 1873 and 1876 represented the Bulimba electorate.

The Hemmant Post Office was renamed in 1875 from Doughboy Creek or Clydesdale Post Office.

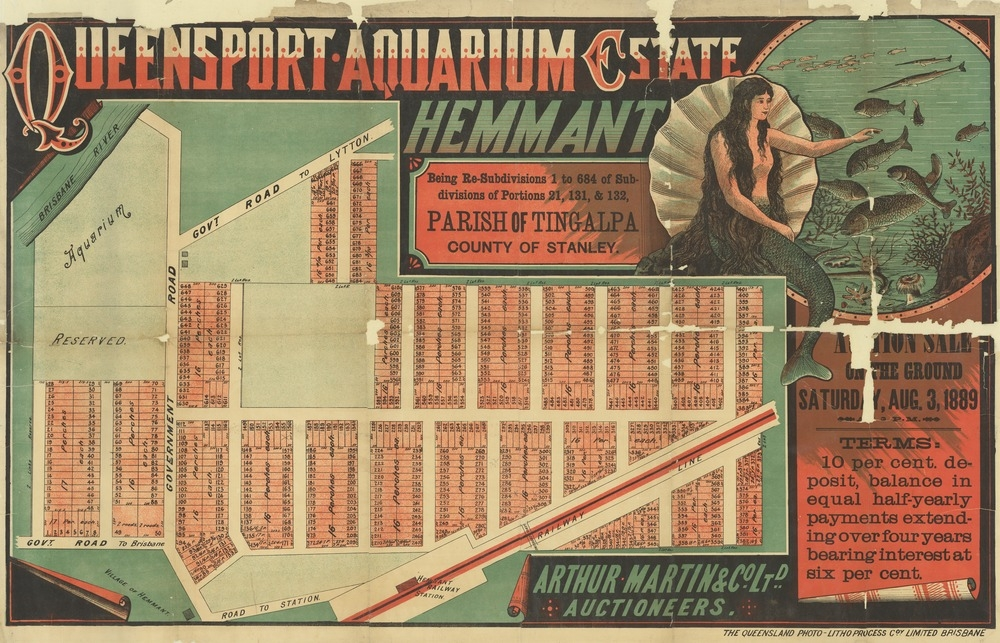
Real estate map of Queensport Aquarium Estate, Hemmant, 1889

In 1889, Queensport Aquarium opened in Hemmant (the present-day location is Aquarium Avenue in Murarrie, 27.447°S 153.102°E). It had a zoo, an aquarium and dance halls and other entertainments. Visitors arrived by riverboats until the 1893 flood during which the animals were rescued but the attractions were damaged closed down. It had closed by the late 1890s, but a dance hall continued to operate until 1901.

In August 1889, 684 subdivided allotments of "Queensport Aquarium Estate" were advertised to be auctioned by Arthur Martin & Co Ltd, auctioneers. A map advertising the auction shows the Estate was close to Hemmant Station. Newspaper advertising states the Estate was adjoining the Aquarium grounds, and had the most fertile soil within many miles of the city.

In December 1919, "Wells-Carlille Estate" made up of 95 allotments were advertised to be auctioned by F. C. Emmott, real property salesman. A map advertising the auction states the Estate was at Lindum, 10 miles from Brisbane and on the Cleveland Line.

In May 1924, "Hemmant Park Estate" made up of 104 allotments were advertised to be auctioned by Isles, Love & Co. Limited. A map advertising the auction states the Estate is right at the door of Hemmant Railway Station.

St Joseph the Worker Catholic Church opened on 25 September 1955.

St Philip's Anglican Church was dedicated on 3 May 1964 by Coadjutor Bishop Hudson. It closed circa 1975.

In 1988, an old quarry site became the Hemmant Quarry Reserve, next to the Hemmant Cemetery (which, despite their names, are now within the boundaries of Tingalpa not Hemmant).

Bayside Uniting Church was established in 1990 in Wondall Road, Manly West, combining four Uniting Churches located at:

- Ashton Street, Wynnum, a former Methodist Church
- Kingsley Terrace, Manly, a former Methodist Church
- Preston Road, Manly West, a former Methodist Church
- Yamboyna Street, Manly, a former Congregational Church

Due to earlier or later closures, the Bayside Uniting Church also incorporated congregations from:

- "The Springs" Methodist Church in Manly Road, Manly West
- Lota Methodist Church in Ambool Street, Lota
- Lindum Methodist Church at 174 Sibley Road, Wynnum West
- Hemmant Methodist Church in Hemmant-Tingalpa Road, Hemmant

== Demographics ==
Census Date	Population
1911	292
1921	432
1947	614
1976	1,426
1991	1,579
2001	2,209
2006	2,680
2011	2,594
2016	2,385.

In the 2006 census, Hemmant had a population of 2,680.

In the 2011 census, Hemmant recorded a population of 2,594 people, 50.4% female and 49.6% male. The median age of the Hemmant population was 34 years of age, 3 years below the Australian median. 74.9% of people living in Hemmant were born in Australia, compared to the national average of 69.8%; the next most common countries of birth were New Zealand 8.2%, England 3.3%, Philippines 1.6%, Fiji 0.8%, China 0.5%. 88.4% of people spoke only English at home; the next most common languages were 0.8% Cantonese, 0.8% Hindi, 0.5% Tagalog, 0.5% Filipino, 0.5% Vietnamese.

In the 2016 census, Hemmant had a population of 2,385 people.

In the 2021 census, Hemmant had a population of 2,886 people.

== Heritage listings ==
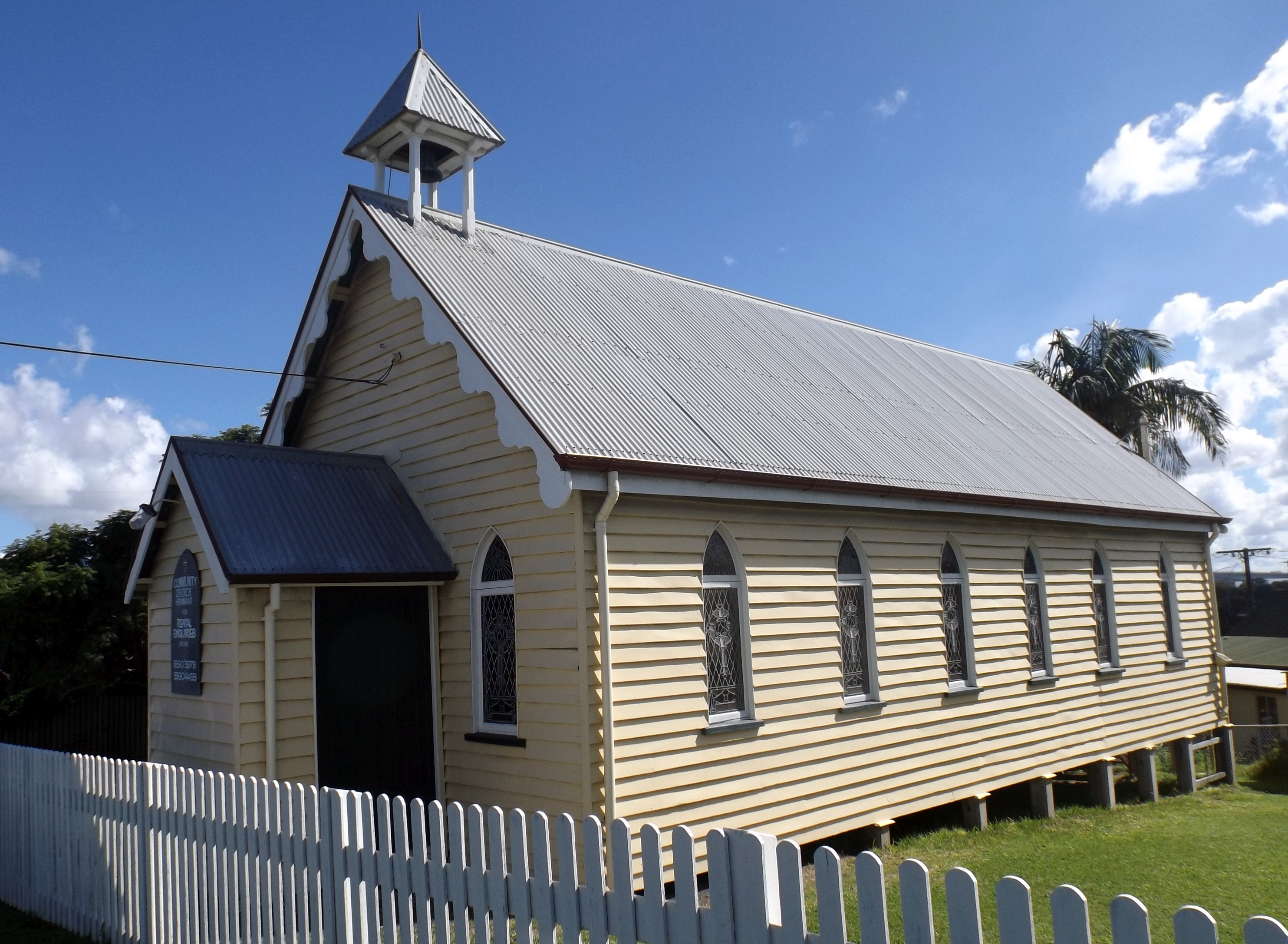
Hemmant Christian Community Church, 2015

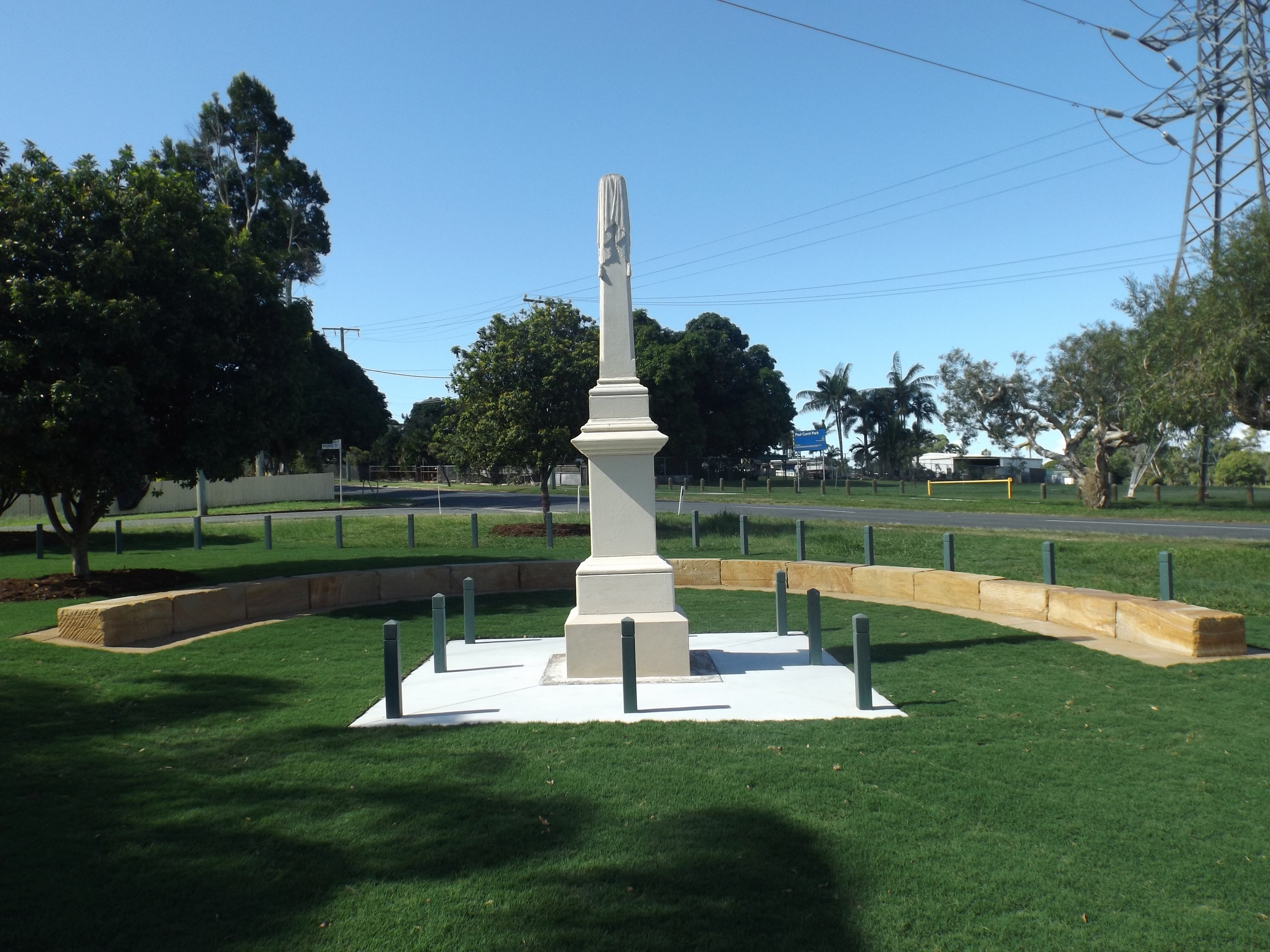
Anning Monument, 2015

Hemmant has a number of heritage-listed sites, including:

- 214, 241, 228 and 274 Fleming Road: Hemmant Gun Battery (also known as Hemmant Gun Emplacements, 390 Heavy Anti-Aircraft Gun Station Class A)
- 49 Gosport Street: Queensport Hotel
- 60 Gross Avenue: Early Farmhouse
- 56 Hemmant-Tingalpa Road: Hemmant State School and Dumbarton (also known as Doughboy Creek Mixed School, Bulimba Creek School, Ashcroft House, Gibson House, Hemmant Flexible Learning Centre)
- 69 Hemmant-Tingalpa Road: Hemmant Christian Community Church (also known as Tingalpa Wesleyan Methodist Church, Hemmant Methodist Church, Hemmant Uniting Church)
- 109 Hemmant-Tingalpa Road (corner of Boonoo Street): Anning Monument (also known as Hemmant Boer War Memorial)
- 180 Youngs Road: former United States Army Transmitting Station

== Education ==
Hemmant Flexible Learning Centre is a Catholic secondary (7–12) school for boys and girls at 56 Hemmant-Tingalpa Road (27.4480°S 153.1268°E). In 2017, the school had an enrolment of 97 students with 10 teachers (8 full-time equivalent) and 12 non-teaching staff (9 full-time equivalent).

There are no government schools in Hemmant. The nearest government primary schools are in Murarrie, Tingalpa, Wynnum, and Wynnum West. The nearest government secondary school is Brisbane Bayside State College in Wynnum West.

== Amenities ==
St Joseph the Worker Church is a Roman Catholic church on the corner of Youngs Road and Peplow Street where mass is celebrated every Sunday (27.4536°S 153.1386°E).

The Hemmant Quarry Reserve (immediately adjacent in Tingalpa) is 24 hectares (59 acres) and has walking tracks and picnic facilities.

== Transport ==
Hemmant railway station provides access to regular Queensland Rail City network services to Brisbane and Cleveland.
