= Union Church (Australia) =

Type of church building

In Australia, a Union Church is a church building owned and maintained by a local trust and available to multiple denominations.

Such churches were once common in rural areas. Some were available to all denominations and even to other religions, others specified particular beliefs, such as the Nicene Creed. Many still exist and are in regular use.

== Existing Union Churches ==
=== New South Wales ===
==== Araluen Union Church ====
There is a Union Church at Araluen. It was built, in 1911, on land donated by William Mundy, on the condition that the building could be used by any denomination. It is used currently for Anglican and Uniting services on alternating weeks.

==== Caloola Union Church ====
In Caloola, New South Wales, this is still maintained by a Trust, and has a historic cemetery. It opened and was dedicated in 1865.

As of 2021, four interdenominational Sunday services are conducted each year, with clergy from several denominations attending each.

==== Meroo Union Church ====
The church building was a gift to the community of Meroo Meadow from their landlord, David Berry. The church has a set of war memorial gates.

==== Mangrove Mountain Union Church ====
This is built on land donated in 1912. A new trustee organisation was formed in 2023.

==== Moonan Flat Union Church ====
The Union Church in the village of Moonan Flat, in the Upper Hunter Valley, New South Wales, is used for Anglican and Uniting Church services.

==== Neurea Union Church ====
The small Union Church at the locality of Neurea, south of Wellington, is currently in recess, but not officially closed.

=== Queensland ===
In Queensland, union churches are often titled using words such as "non-denominational", "undenominational", "united" and "community".

==== Caboonbah Undenominational Church ====
Caboonbah Undenominational Church was founded by Henry Plantagenet Somerset, and built by Lars Andersen in 1905 to serve a farming community at Mount Beppo. The wooden structure was designed by Mrs Katherine Rose Somerset and takes its name, "Caboonbah", from the Somerset family homestead, Caboonbah Homestead, nearby.

==== Others ====
- Purga United Church
- United Welsh Church, Blackstone
- Community church, Mount Mee
- Hemmant Christian Community Church
- Ravenswood Community Church

== Historic Union Churches ==
=== New South Wales ===
==== Awaba Union Church ====
There is a small disused Union Church building at Awaba, New South Wales. Land was purchased for the site in 1897.

==== Beckom Union Church ====
There is a disused Union Church building in the village of Beckom.

==== Brocklesby Union Church ====
The building that was formerly the Union Church, at Brocklesby is now privately owned.

==== Burraga Union Church ====
There was a Union Church at Burraga.

==== Cooks Myalls Union Church ====
There is a Union Church at the locality Cooks Myalls, north-west of Parkes. It is probably disused.

==== Craven Union Church ====
The building that was formerly the Union Church, at the locality of Craven, south of Gloucester, is now privately owned.

==== Girilambone Union Church ====
A Union Church was opened at Girilambone, New South Wales, in January 1913. It was in use until at least the mid 1930s.

==== Glen Alice Union Church ====
There is a Union Church building at the small settlement of Glen Alice. Its status is uncertain, but it was in use in 2014.

==== Glen Innes Union Church ====
The building that was formerly the Union Church at Glen Innes is now privately owned.

==== Gulgong Union Church ====
The first church in Gulgong, New South Wales was a Union Church, built around 1870. It was a pole and bark building that stood in Medley Street, probably opposite where the Memorial Hall stands today. After the various denominations built their own churches, the building was used, for a time, as the town's Catholic school.

==== Larbert Union Church ====
There was a Union Church building at Larbert, New South Wales, from around 1878 to some time in the 1970s. All that remains are its steps, foundations and the adjoining cemetery.

==== Marrangaroo Union Church ====
The heritage-listed stone building at Marrangaroo, was once a Union Church. It was opened in 1897, by Joseph Cook. Half the iron for the roof was donated by Lithgow ironmaster, William Sandford. Title was ceded to the Anglican Church, in 1972, and it continued to use the building until around 1980. In 1983 the building was used as a library block for the Gateway Christian School. It reopened as a church, 'Marrangaroo Prayer Chapel', from 1989 to 1997. It is now privately owned.

==== Rydal Union Church ====
There is a Union Church in Rydal, opened in 1899. Its status is uncertain.

==== St John's Union Church, Running Stream ====
There is a now disused Union Church, with a small cemetery, at the locality of Running Stream, off the Castlereagh Highway to the south of Ilford, New South Wales. It opened in 1906, although it seems that the associated cemetery predates the church building.

==== Turill Union Church ====
The building that was formerly the Union Church at the locality of Turill, south-west of Cassilis, is now privately owned.

==== Walcha Union Church ====
There is a disused Union Church at Walcha. It opened in 1885.

==== Yathella Union Church ====
There was a Union Church at Yathella, a locality between Junee and Wagga Wagga. According to its plaque of its foundation stone, now located in the Broadway Museum in Junee, the stone was laid on 15 October 1937. The building was subsequently relocated to Kooringal, but has since been demolished. There was also a public school at the locality from 1880 to 1936.

=== South Australia ===
==== Renmark West Union Church ====
Made from the union of the Presbyterian, Methodist and Congregational Churches. The Church began operating in June 1918 in the Renmark West School with Rev. E. W. Sanders (Methodist) and Rev. A. E. Francis (Congregational) and built their own Church on donated land, starting on 6 November 1919, and opened on 31 October 1920. The Church continues operating today under the Uniting Church of Australia and celebrated its Centenary in November 2019. Services are conducted by the Renmark/Loxton resident Minister every Sunday at 8:30 am.
