= Tingalpa =

- Suburb
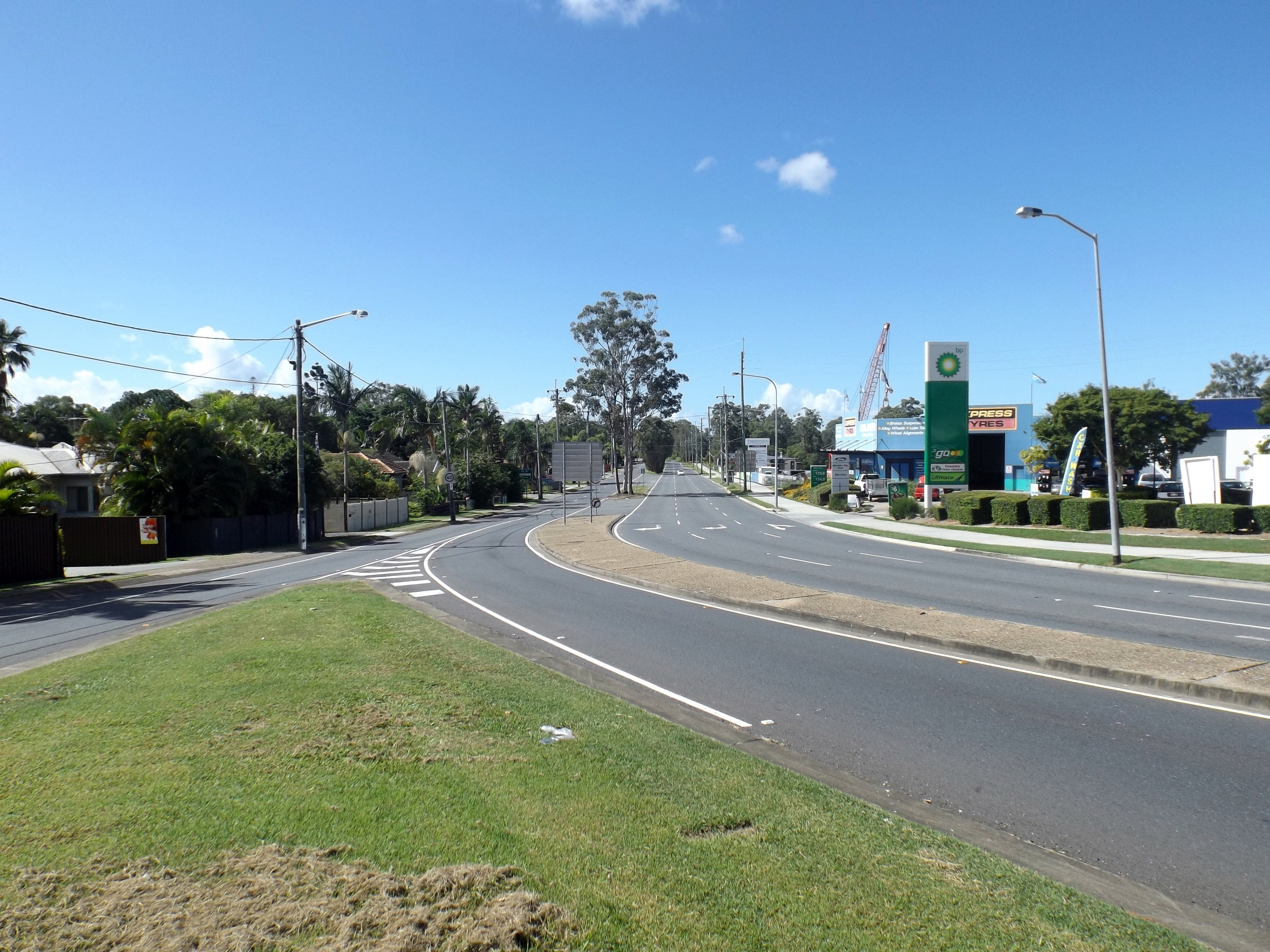
- Wynnum Road, 2015

- Interactive map of Tingalpa
- Coordinates: 27.4733°S 153.1291°E
- Country: Australia
- State: Queensland
- City: Brisbane
- LGA: City of Brisbane (Doboy Ward)
- Location: 13.2 km (8.2 mi) E of Brisbane CBD

Government
  - State electorate: Chatsworth
  - Federal division: Bonner

Area
  - Total: 8.9 km^{2} (3.4 sq mi)

Population
  - Total: 8,461 (2021 census)
  - Density: 951/km^{2} (2,462/sq mi)
- Time zone: UTC+10:00 (AEST)
- Postcode: 4173
Suburbs around Tingalpa
Murarrie	Hemmant	Wynnum West; Manly West
Cannon Hill	Tingalpa	Wakerley
Carina; Carindale	Belmont	Gumdale

Tingalpa is a suburb in the City of Brisbane, Queensland, Australia. In the 2021 census, Tingalpa had a population of 8,461 people.

== Geography ==
The suburb is bounded to the west by Bulimba Creek, a tributary of the Brisbane River.

The suburb has some older style homes built in the post war period – weatherboard and chamferboard post war cottages in particular. Most of the new estates are made up of typically low set and high set brick and tile homes. Previously the land that is now being developed into residential zones was devoted to small farmlets and semi-industrial developments.

The recent developments, which occurred in the last five years, are increasing the population and the median house prices of the suburb.

== History ==
Tingalpa Creek was surveyed in 1841 and named Tingulpa. The origin of Tingalpa's name is uncertain. It may be derived from an Aboriginal expression referring to a fat kangaroo, or named after Tingalpa Creek, which lies 5 kilometres (3.1 mi) east, or be derived from the Turrubal words tangul (meaning 'plant for stupefying fish') and pa (meaning 'place').

In 1863, a township site was surveyed on the west side of Tingalpa Creek, where Old Cleveland Road crossed the creek. It was never built on and was known as Old Tingalpa. In 1943, this location was formally abolished. In 1860s a new site was settled called New Tingalpa, away to the north-west.

In 1867, a post office was opened.

In 1867, a local architect, Richard Suter designed the Gothic Anglican Christ Church, which was built in 1868. The church and burial ground located at 1341 Wynnum Road, east of Bulimba Creek (27.473°S 153.1117°E).

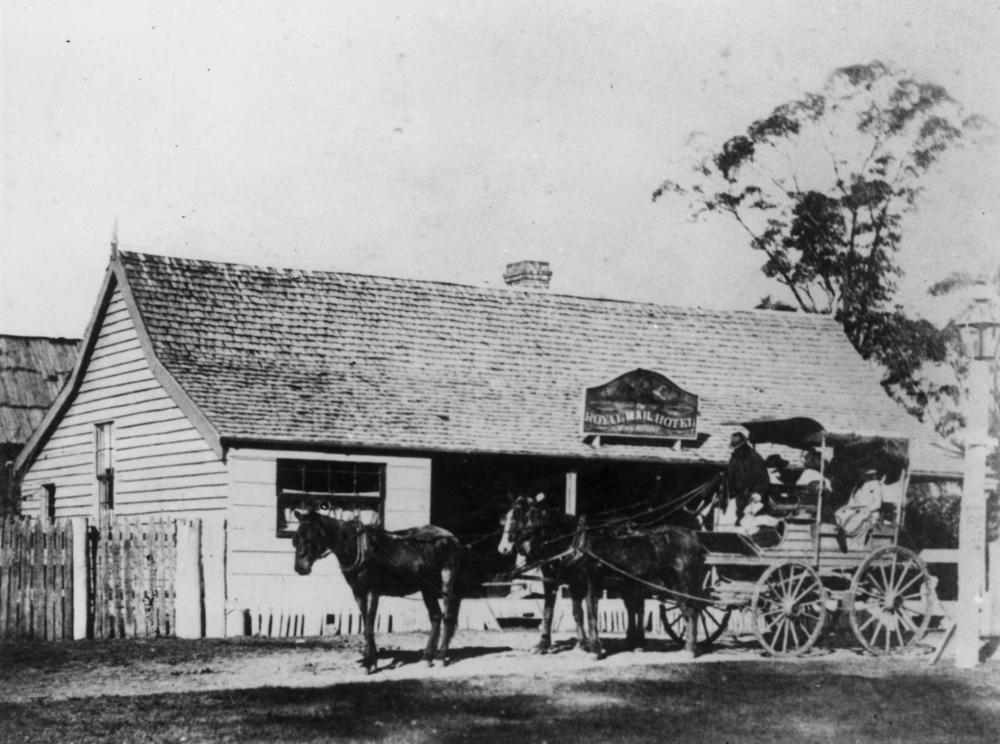
Royal Mail Hotel, 1876

The Royal Mail Hotel was licensed in 1870. It was a stopping place for Cobb & Co stagecoaches. The Tingalpa Hotel now occupies the site at 1564 Wynnum Road (27.4749°S 153.1277°E).

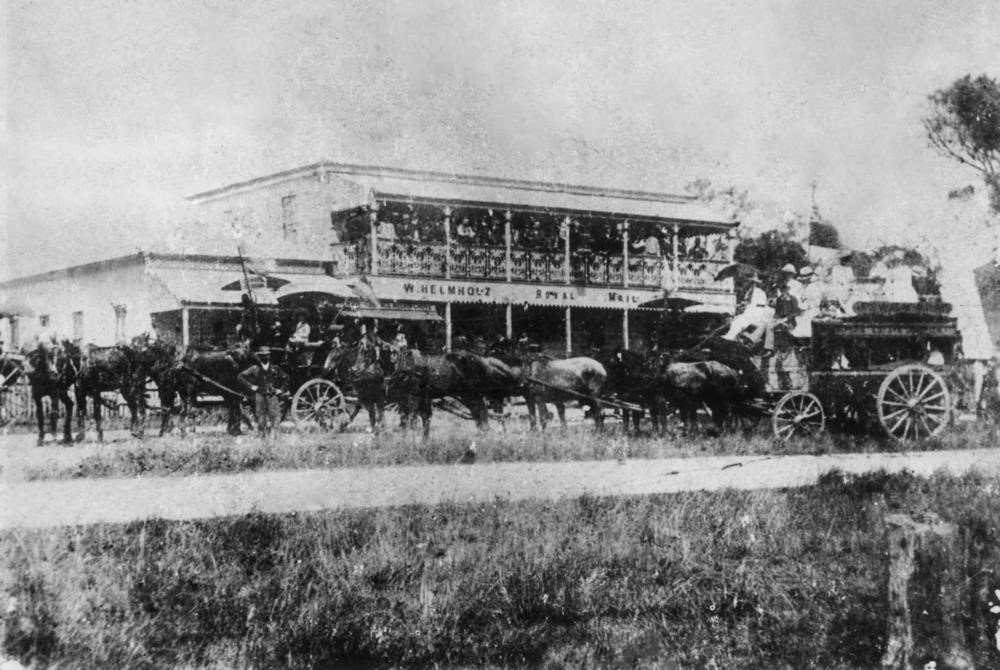
Royal Mail Hotel, 1893

On 1 August 1870, the Board of Education received a letter from Mr. W. Wood, a local farmer in the Tingalpa Shire about the necessity of having a school for the district. Funds were raised by the community to buy the original 2 acres and also to build a temporary school located at 1546 Wynnum Road. On 1 August 1873, the Tingalpa school was opened. Bernard McGouran was the first head teacher. The school started with 50 pupils on the roll, by June 1874 there were 99 students. The primary reason for enrolling in the early years was to learn to speak English, as the most commonly use language was the local Aboriginal dialect. In 1923, a new school was built.

Tingalpa Cemetery had its first burial in 1875. In 1913 it was renamed Hemmant Cemetery. Lawn cemeteries were added from 1952. In 2001 a crematorium opened at the cemetery. Despite the name change, as at 2020, it is within the boundaries of Tingalpa and not Hemmant (27.4680°S 153.1344°E).

In 1880, a local government division was established for the Tingalpa area. The boundaries of this area were "south-east from the intersection of the Pacific Highway and the Mount Gravatt-Capalaba Road, crossing the Tingalpa Creek and ending at Redland Bay." The headquarters of the local government were located at Mount Cotton.

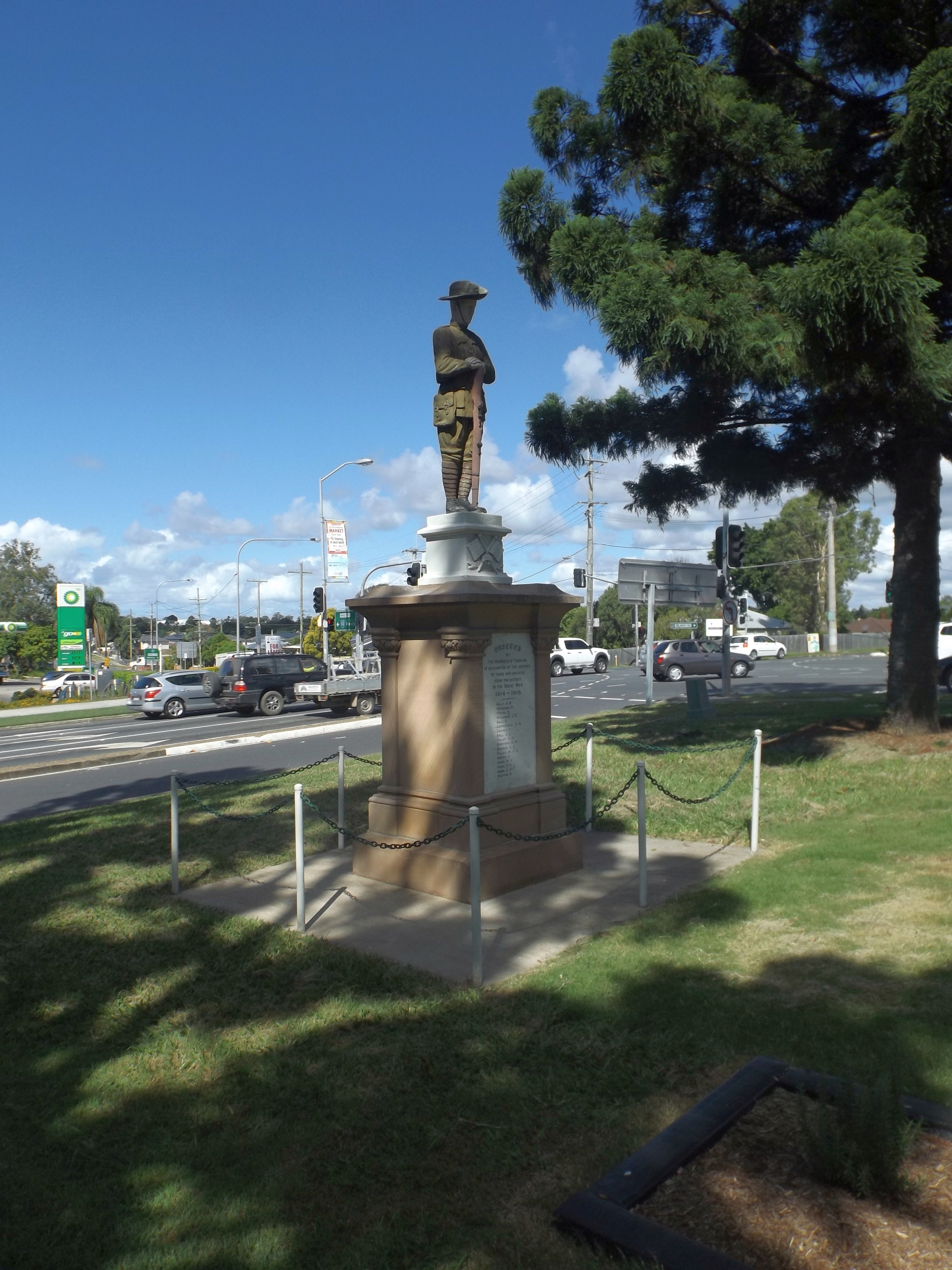
War memorial, 2015

The Wynnum and Manly Road are where the above facilities are roughly located. In 1919, the diggers's war memorial was erected, making this location more prominent. In 1925, the west part of the Shire of Tingalpa become part of the Greater City of Brisbane. In 1949 the rest of the shire was joined with the Shire of Cleveland, becoming Shire of Redland (now City of Redland). In the 1949 Queensland Post Office Directory there were eight poultry farms and there are fewer dairymen. There was also two motor garages and the Pacific Cafe on Wynnum Road.

In 2011, one of the first Masters Home Improvement retail outlets in Queensland opened in Tingalpa and was located at the intersection of Wynnym Road and New Cleveland Road up until its closure in December 2016.

== Demographics ==
By 1980 the population of Tingalpa had nearly tripled from 1400 people in 1954.

Census Date	Population
1881 census	21
1911 census	244
1954 census	1,376
1976 census	3,663
1991 census	4,751
2001 census	8,934
2006 census	8,173
2011 census	8,539
2016 census	8,290
2021 census	8,461

The 2011 census recorded 8,539 residents in Tingalpa, of whom 50.5% were female and 49.5% were male. The median age of the population was 35; 2 years younger than the Australian average. 72.1% of people living in Tingalpa were born in Australia, with the next most common countries of birth being New Zealand (6.9%), England (3.8%), the Philippines (1.4%), Fiji (0.9%), and India (0.8%). 84.5% of people spoke English as their first language, while the other most common responses were Hindi (1%), Greek (0.9%), Tagalog (0.7%), Cantonese (0.7%), and Spanish (0.6%).

In the 2016 census, Tingalpa had a population of 8,290 people.

In the 2021 census, Tingalpa had a population of 8,461 people.

== Heritage listings ==
Anglican Christ Church, 1906

Tingalpa has a number of heritage-listed sites:

- Hemmant Cemetery, 500 Hemmant-Tingalpa Road (27.4638°S 153.1352°E)
- Tingalpa War Memorial, Manly Road (27.4746°S 153.1292°E)
- Richmond Bridge, Wynnum Road (27.4711°S 153.1073°E)
- Christ Church and cemetery, 1341 Wynnum Road (27.473°S 153.1117°E)

== Education ==
Tingalpa State School is a government primary (Prep-6) school for boys and girls at 1546 Wynnum Road (27.4735°S 153.1264°E). In 2015, the school had an enrolment of 328 children with 26 teachers (22 full-time equivalent). In 2018, the school had an enrolment of 432 students with 38 teachers (31 full-time equivalent) and 19 non-teaching staff (13 full-time equivalent).

There are no secondary schools in Tingalpa. The nearest government secondary school is Brisbane Bayside State College in neighbouring Wynnum West to the north-east.

== Facilities ==
Hemmant Cemetery and Crematorium is 500 Hemmant Tingalpa Road (18.3140°S 102.0939°E). Although the cemetery is within the suburb of Tingalpa, the access is from the neighbouring suburb of Hemmant.

== Amenities ==
Tingalpa Uniting Church is at 61 Belmont Road (27.4769°S 153.1285°E).

Wynnum District Horse & Pony Club is at 50 Bognor Street (27.4663°S 153.1454°E).

Tingalpa features a large amount of parks and bushland, including:

- Carmichael Park in the north of the suburb (27.4685°S 153.1252°E)
- Kianawah Park in the south of the suburb (27.4781°S 153.1247°E)
- Meadowlands Picnic Ground Park (27.4849°S 153.1190°E) in the south-west of the suburb, part of the Minnippi Parklands

Kianawah Park is the oldest park in the suburb and has extensive facilities.

Moreton Bay Sports Club is also located at Carmichael Park next to the creek. The venue hosts cricket and Brisbane Premier League matches with 2001 and 2010 grand final winners, and 2011 League Champions Wolves FC. Kianawah Park is the oldest park in the suburb and has extensive facilities.

Tingalpa has bike paths going through their parks and these are part of the extensive bike paths that are throughout Brisbane.

== Transport ==
Also nearby is the Murarrie railway station that runs west to the city and east to Manly and the bay. There are also several bus routes from Tingalpa to neighbouring suburbs.
