= Queensport Aquarium =

Coordinates: 27.447°S 153.102°E

The Queensport Aquarium is considered the first amusement park in Queensland, Australia. It was located at Hemmant (in present-day Murarrie) in Brisbane on the lower reaches of the Brisbane River. It operated from 1889 to 1901.

The Aquarium was officially opened with great celebration on 7 August 1889. In addition to the aquarium with its marine life ranging from seals to sharks, there were the "finest collection of tigers in captivity", a black Java panther, a cheetah, bears, monkeys, a collection of birds (parrots, cockatoos, pigeons, doves, English finches and black swans) and reptiles.

Viewing the animals was only part of the entertainment at Queensland's first theme park. The huge concert hall was equipped with an organ which entertained guests at concerts on Saturday and Sunday afternoons. There was also an Aquarium Band to serenade the "best singers" who could be found in Brisbane. The Aquarium boosted the popularity of the area; land near the Aquarium was subdivided and sold as The Queensport Aquarium Estate.

The crowds who visited the Aquarium arrived by steamer from the Aquarium Company's own wharf in the Brisbane city centre. This was a package deal. The return fare on the steamers Natone, the Woolwich or the Alice cost two shillings for adults and one shilling for a child. Moonlit excursions to dances in the concert hall were well patronised. The Aquarium and its hall were equipped with every modern convenience including electric light which was connected in September 1889.

Daytime activities included sports days to celebrate the new year, picnics on Foundation Day (as Australia Day was then known) and, in May 1891, the amazing sight of a hot air balloon delighted the crowd. The Brisbane Courier reported, "Professor Fernandez, an aeronaut who has performed many remarkable feats in the Southern colonies, appeared at the Queensport Aquarium and made his first balloon ascent in this colony", a feat which nearly ended in disaster when the balloon began to deflate and appeared likely to sink into the river. Fortunately, the balloon rose again and landed safely.

The Aquarium was not greatly troubled by the large flood in 1890, even though the wharf in the city was inundated. However, the flood on 5 and 6 February 1893 tore down the fences, liberating many of the animals, and ruined the carefully landscaped gardens. The animals were rescued, but the building was subsequently used as a dance hall. Before long, J D Campbell and the Aquarium Company advertised the sale of the steamers and, although picnic parties from the city continued to travel to dances and picnics, the Aquarium's popularity had diminished by the end of the 19th century.
