= Angus Gibson =

Australian politician

The Honourable Angus Gibson
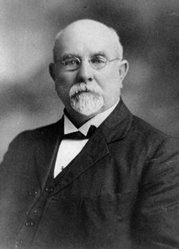

Member of the Queensland Legislative Council
- In office 6 April 1899 – 28 May 1920

Personal details
- Born: James Gibbon; 25 April 1842 Kilmaurs, Ayrshire, Scotland
- Died: 28 May 1920 (aged 78) Brisbane, Queensland, Australia
- Resting place: South Kolan Cemetery
- Spouse: Catherine Martin (m.1866 d.1920)
- Occupation: Sugar planter

Angus Gibson (1842–1920) was a sugar planter and politician. He was a Member of the Queensland Legislative Council.

== Political life ==
Angus Gibson was a member of Gooburrum Divisional Board and its chairman in 1888. From 1895 to 1900, he was a member of the Kolan Divisional Board from 1895 to 1900.

On 6 April 1899, he was appointed to the Queensland Legislative Council, ending with his death on 28 May 1920. Gibson was buried in South Kolan Cemetery.
