= Ramsay Health Care UK =

English private healthcare company

- Industry: Health
- Founded: 2007
- Founder: Paul Ramsay
- Headquarters: London, United Kingdom
- Number of locations: 34
- Key people: Nick Costa (CEO)
- Services: Health care
- Parent: Ramsay Health Care
- Website: www.ramsayhealth.co.uk

Ramsay Health Care UK is a healthcare company based in the United Kingdom. It was founded by Australian businessman Paul Ramsay, who established its parent company: Ramsay Health Care, in Sydney, Australia, in 1964 and has grown to become a global hospital group operating 151 hospitals and day surgery facilities across Australia, the United Kingdom, France, Indonesia and Malaysia.

In 2007, Capio was acquired by Ramsay Health Care. It was the first purchase abroad for the company and beat a number of other rivals. At the time, Capio was the fourth largest private hospitals operator in the UK.

In 2017 turnover fell 4.8% compared to 2016, down to £208 million, and this was blamed on "NHS demand management strategies". The company is more dependent on NHS work, largely through the Choose and Book system, than other private healthcare providers in the UK. In June 2018 it wrote down the value of some of its sites because NHS demand management strategies were having a significant negative impact on volume of business, but in 2019 it announced that NHS referrals had increased by 7.4% and it had benefited from an increase in NHS tariff prices.

In 2021 it made a bid to acquire Spire Healthcare for almost £1 billion. Spire is a much bigger operation in the UK than Ramsay. The final price for Spire's 39 hospitals and eight clinics in the UK was agreed at $1.42 billion, but was rejected.

Documents obtained by the Guardian and Good Law Project showed that Ramsay received £380 million in contracts from the UK government for surge capacity during the Covid-19 pandemic, but most of the beds provided went unused.

== Facilities ==
The UK network includes 36 private facilities offer a range of treatments from hip replacements to knee replacement surgery and cosmetic surgery to weight loss surgery. It provides a number of Independent sector treatment centres for the English NHS. In 2021 it generated about 80% of its revenues from contracts with the NHS.

In 2015 Ramsay Health Care UK partnered with GenesisCare to build new treatment facilities at Rivers Hospital, Sawbridgeworth, and Springfield Hospital, Chelmsford, where the facilities relocated their chemotherapy services to. GenesisCare also provided their radiotherapy services from the centres alongside Ramsay.

Ramsay Health Care UK installed the IMS MAXIMS electronic patient record in all its 35 hospital sites in 2022, the first private healthcare provider in the UK to implement a system of this scale.

== Quality ==
Simon Healey, 60, died from sepsis in August 2017 nine days after bowel surgery at the Berkshire Independent Hospital in Reading. A claim brought by Mr Healey's widow Alison was settled by Ramsay Health Care UK, which runs the hospital, in 2022. In July 2014, nineteen patients, two of whom suffered serious ill effects, were given overdoses of an antibiotic administered into their eyes during surgery at Mount Stuart Hospital. Ramsay said the error was the result “of both process failure and human error”.

Oaklands Hospital in Salford was rated inadequate by the Care Quality Commission in March 2017. They reported that "There was a culture of fear within theatres, which resulted in staff not challenging unsafe behaviours..."

In 2018, Ramsay Health Care UK was the first hospital group to launch Speak Up for Safety™ a "staff accountability programme" across 33 of its hospitals to "strengthen its reporting culture and help safeguard patients."

== See also ==
- Private healthcare in the United Kingdom
