= Mitcham Private Hospital =

- Ramsay Health Care

Geography
- Location: 27 Doncaster E Rd, Mitcham VIC 3132, Victoria, Australia
- Coordinates: 37°37′N 41°40′E

Services
- Beds: 121

History
- Founded: 1963

Links
- Website: www.mitchamprivate.com.au
- Lists: Hospitals in Australia

Mitcham Private Hospital, formerly known as 31 Doncaster East Road Specialist Medical Centre from 1941 to 1963, is a hospital in Mitcham, Victoria, Australia.

The hospital is part of Ramsay Health Care.

== History ==
The hospital was founded in 1963, following the merger of 31 Doncaster East Road Specialist Medical Centre and the 29 Doncaster East Road, Childbirth Clinic.

In 1994, Mitcham Private was named by UNICEF as the first "baby friendly" Hospital in Australia.

== See also ==
- List of hospitals in Australia
- Healthcare in Australia
