= Thomas Berglund =

Thomas Berglund may refer to:

- Thomas Berglund (ice hockey) (born 1969), Swedish ice hockey player
- Thomas Berglund (corporate executive), Swedish corporate executive
