= Hanlon Park / Bur'uda =

Creek rewilding project in Brisbane, Australia

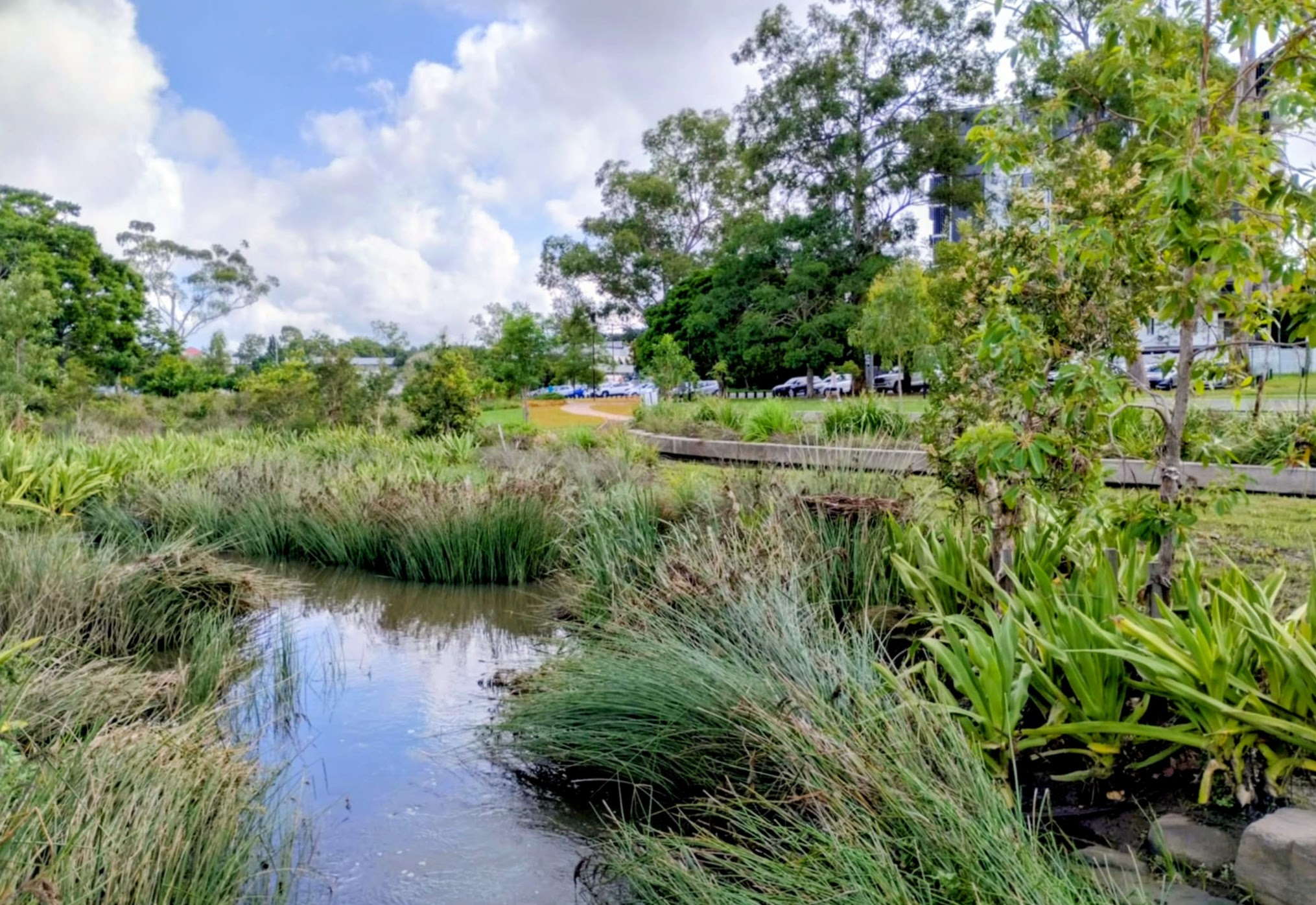
Waterway within Hanlon Park / Bur'uda, Stones Corner, 2025

Hanlon Park / Bur'uda is an urban park in Brisbane, Australia and the focus of the Hanlon Park / Bur'uda Waterway Rejuvenation project. The centrepiece of the park is a rejuvenated stretch of Norman Creek, which from the 1930s until 2019 had been an open concrete drain, and was transformed into what has been described as a "living waterway" and a "vibrant urban oasis" that is home to native plants and animals.

This example of urban rewilding has won several awards, and its success has informed the design of other rejuvenation projects. The site's dual names derive from the late Ned Hanlon, a former Premier of Queensland, and Bur'uda, a word meaning "forest oak" in the language of the site’s traditional owners, the Nunukul Jagera people.

== Location ==
Hanlon Park / Bur'uda is a 5.2 hectare site bounded by O’Keefe, Junction, Cornwall and Lincoln streets in Stones Corner, a medium-density inner suburb of Brisbane. The site contains public parkland, picnic and BBQ areas, public toilets, sport facilities, walking/cycling paths, seating, a nature-themed playground, public art, and areas of native vegetation around the regenerated Norman Creek.

The park is close to major transport routes such as Old Cleveland Road, Logan Road, the Pacific Motorway, Eastern Busway, Veloway 1 bike path and Cleveland railway line. The South-East Freeway Bikeway passes through the park. Stones Corner is a local commercial and transport hub whose residential density is projected to increase under the Brisbane City Council's Stones Corner Renewal Plan. Thus, one function of Hanlon Park is to provide green space for current and future residents of a growing inner-city suburb.

Activities at the rejuvenated site have included a weekly park run, a tour featured in Brisbane Open House 2025, free community dinners hosted by the local federal MP, and monthly working bees coordinated by the Norman Creek Catchment Coordinating Committee (N4C).

== History ==
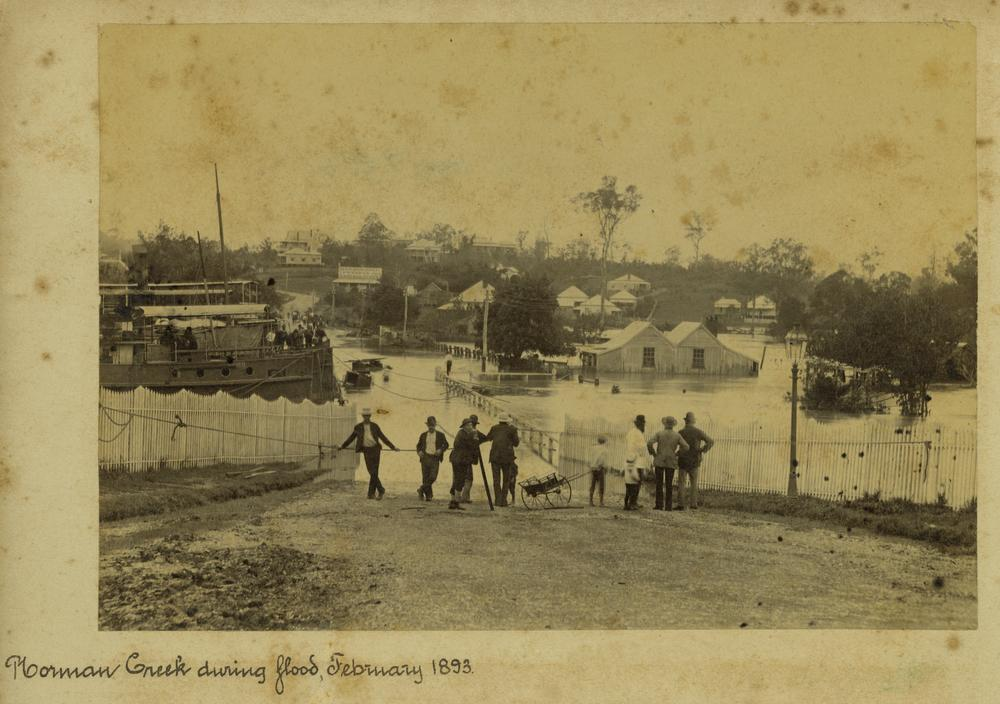
Flooding at Norman Creek, 1893

Norman Creek, a tributary of the Brisbane River, was called Kulpurum by Aboriginal people and was a source of food and resources for them prior to the European settlement of Australia. Early settlers in what is now Stones Corner referred to the area around the creek as Burnett's Swamp. During the 19th century this area transitioned from farming to industrial and residential use.

This part of the creek is tidal, and prone to flooding after heavy rain. In the 1930s, in an attempt at flood mitigation, this section of the creek was channelized into an open concrete drain, with the goal that rain would flow away quickly instead of flooding. However channelization destroyed the ecosystem of the creek and simply moved flooding downstream.

In 1954, the Brisbane City Council decided to rename part of Burnett's Swamp to be Hanlon Park and part to be A. J. Jones Recreational Reserve.

The roots of the rejuvenation project lie in environmental and flood mitigation activism starting in the 1970s, including community protest against development near Coorparoo Station by Turbo Investments in the 1980s, and agitation by the Norman Creek Flood Action Group for better flood prevention. In 1991, a Brisbane City Council (BCC) project to straighten Norman Creek between Deshon and Stanley streets created an opportunity for citizens to regenerate 4 hectares of former industrial land at Moorhen Flats, between the new and old watercourses.

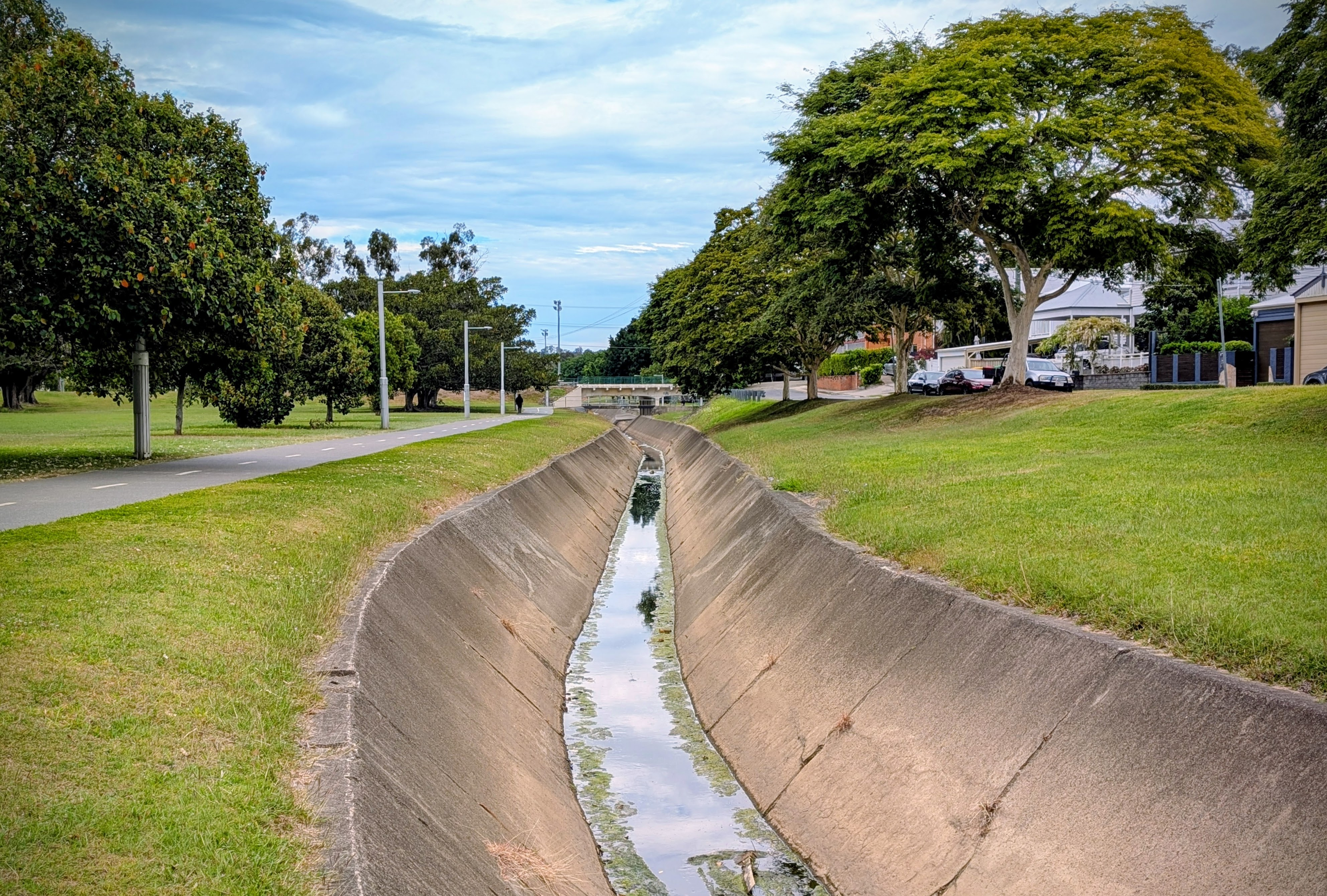
Norman Creek as concrete channel

The Norman Creek Catchment Coordinating Committee (N4C) was formed in 1996. It forms part of the Brisbane Catchments Network, which manages environmental work across 12 major waterway catchments in the Brisbane area, and formalizes the relationship between volunteer environmentalists and the Brisbane City Council. The BCC's Norman Creek master plan acknowledges the passion of local volunteers as an inspiration for the rejuvenation project.

== Hanlon Park / Bur'uda Waterway Rejuvenation project ==
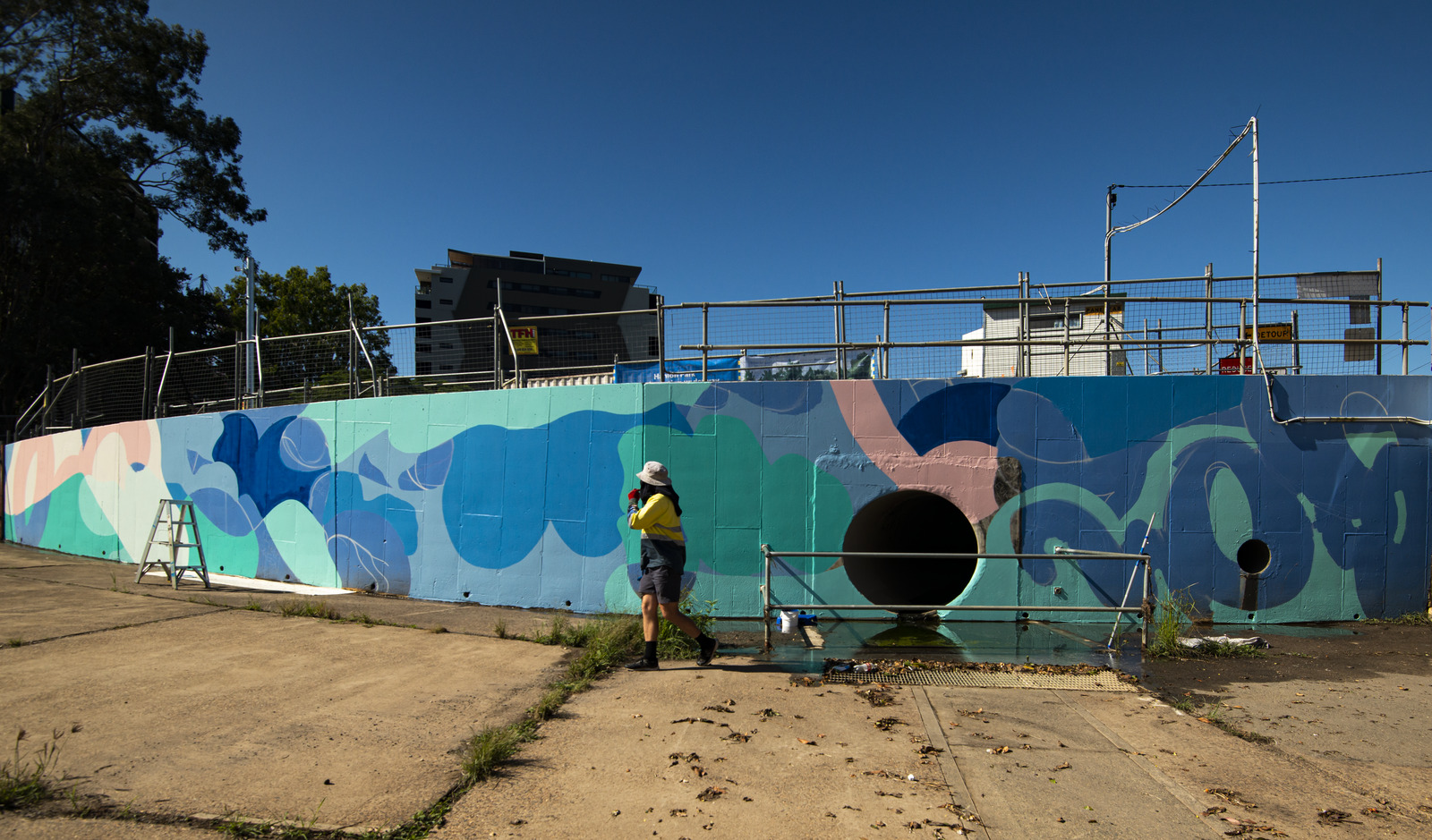
Callum Francis working on the large mural 'Hanlon Park', Hanlon Park, Greenslopes, Brisbane, 11 May 2021

In 2010, the Brisbane City Council initiated a review of Norman Creek, resulting in a masterplan for the period 2012 to 2031 that identified Hanlon Park as a "priority precinct". In 2012, the Norman Creek Catchment Coordinating Committee developed a concept plan that referenced existing waterway rejuvenation projects such as River LA in the USA and Cheonggyecheon in South Korea. In response to ongoing flood problems, and as an alternative to replacing the aging concrete drain, N4C proposed replacing the drain with a renaturalised creek.

With Council approval, detailed design began in 2018 that involved multidisciplinary collaboration between the Brisbane City Council, Norman Creek Catchment Coordinating Committee (key stakeholder), Nunukul Yuggera Traditional Custodians (cultural collaborators), Bligh Tanner engineering (design), AECOM (concept design and community engagement),Tract landscape architects (landscape architecture), Litoria environmental consulting (ecologist), Gaskell Planning Consultants (master planning), Webb Australia (electrical design), Core Consultants (geotechnical engineering), Epoca constructions (principal contractor) and Belinda Smith (artist). Design involved extensive consultation with local communities. The project's citation in the 2023 National Landscape Architecture Awards noted that a major challenge was to balance the multiple needs for biodiversity, flood mitigation, cultural significance, and community facilities.

Construction began in 2019, converting 500 metres (1,600 ft) of concrete drain into 800 metres (2,600 ft) of renaturalised creek bed, and planting 462 trees and 56,000 shrubs, reeds and groundcover plants. Concrete from the drain was repurposed in new earthworks at the site. Work included extensive geotechnical, services, groundwater, ecological and surface water quality investigations. Construction introduced new concrete paths, park and feature lighting, nature play for children, and public art, while infrastructure such as sewers, water, telecommunications and electrical required coordination with relevant authorities. Alan Hoban, director of Stormwater Australia and an environmental engineer at Bligh Tanner, described it as "the biggest creek naturalisation project in Australia".

After lobbying from groups including Stones Corner Road Safety, East Bicycle User Group, Brisbane CBD Bicycle User Group, and the Better Buranda Project, the BCC and Queensland Government agreed to add an underpass for cyclists and pedestrians, preventing people walking or cycling along Norman Creek from needing to cross a busy road.

The newly meandering, revegetated creek slows water movement and absorbs pollutants from upstream. The rejuvenated park was opened in July 2022 at a ceremony led by Brisbane Lord Mayor Adrian Schrinner and Coorparoo Ward councillor Fiona Cunningham.

== Outcomes and ongoing work ==
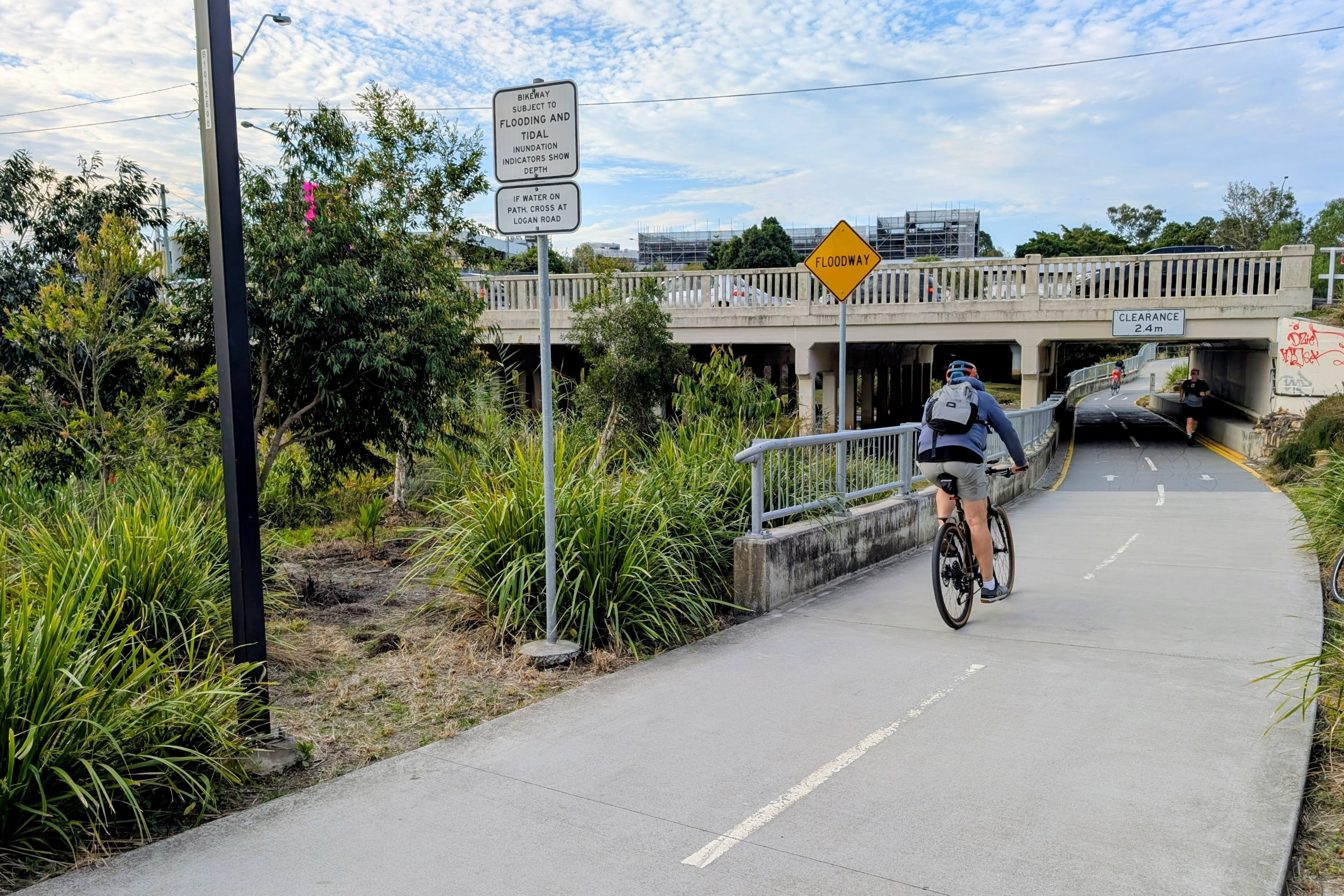
The underpass for cyclists and pedestrians at Hanlon Park, Brisbane, allowing safe passage under Logan Road.

The park’s resilience to flooding has been tested by a major flood in 2022 and another following Cyclone Alfred in 2025. In both cases the site recovered quickly, needing only minor cleaning and replanting; N4C president Stephanie Ford attributed this partly to the introduction of sedge and lomandra plants in the creek beds and banks.

A 2024 post-construction survey by Litoria Consulting reported a tripling of fish abundance and a doubling of species richness at the site.

Ongoing maintenance of the site is undertaken by the Brisbane City Council, with weeding and other activities undertaken by a bushcare group based at N4C.

The project’s successes and challenges have informed planned regeneration work at nearby Kingfisher Creek as well as at other sites in Brisbane including Oxley Creek, Archerfield Wetlands and Kedron Brook.

== Awards ==
Hanlon Park / Bur'uda has received multiple awards including the 2023 AILA National Climate Positive Design Award, 2023 AILA National Landscape Architecture Award for Land Management, 2023 AILA National Award of Excellence for Parks and Open Space, AILA 2023 QLD Award of Excellence for Land Management, AILA 2023 QLD Award of Excellence for Parks and Open Space, and the 2022 Excellence in Integrated Stormwater Design Award.

The rejuvenation project was featured in a May 2023 episode of ABC TV's Gardening Australia.

== See also ==
- Bush regeneration
- Floods in Australia
