= Carl-Henric Svanberg =

Swedish businessman (born 1952)

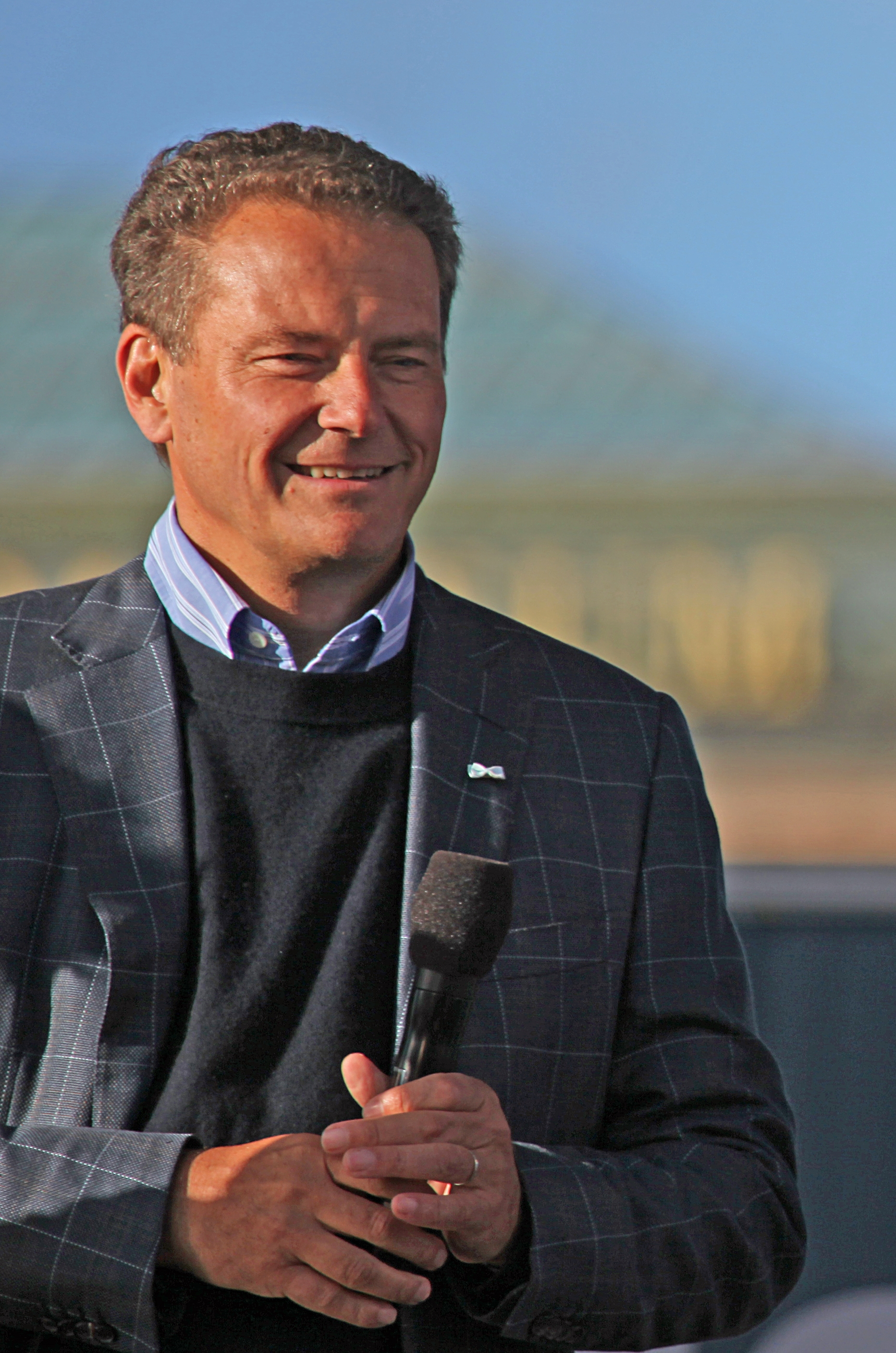
- Born: 29 May 1952 (age 74); Porjus, Sweden
- Occupation: Chairman of Volvo

12th chairman of BP
- In office 2010–2018
- Preceded by: Peter Sutherland
- Succeeded by: Helge Lund

Carl-Henric Svanberg (born 29 May 1952) is a Swedish business executive and current chairman of Volvo. He was chairman of BP for eight years from 2010 to 2018. In December 2023, Svanberg was appointed chair to the Commission on artificial intelligence to the Swedish government.

== Education ==
Svanberg holds a master's degree in applied physics from the Linköping Institute of Technology and a bachelor's degree in business administration from Uppsala University. Svanberg holds honorary doctorates from Luleå University of Technology and Linköping University.

== Career ==
Svanberg was chief executive of telecom company Ericsson from April 2003 to December 2009. Following his resignation, he remained on the board of Ericsson and holds 3,234,441 shares in the company.

Before joining Ericsson, he led another Swedish industrial company, Assa Abloy. Svanberg is on other boards, including:

- The investment company Melker Schörling AB
- Stockholm Challenge Advisory Board

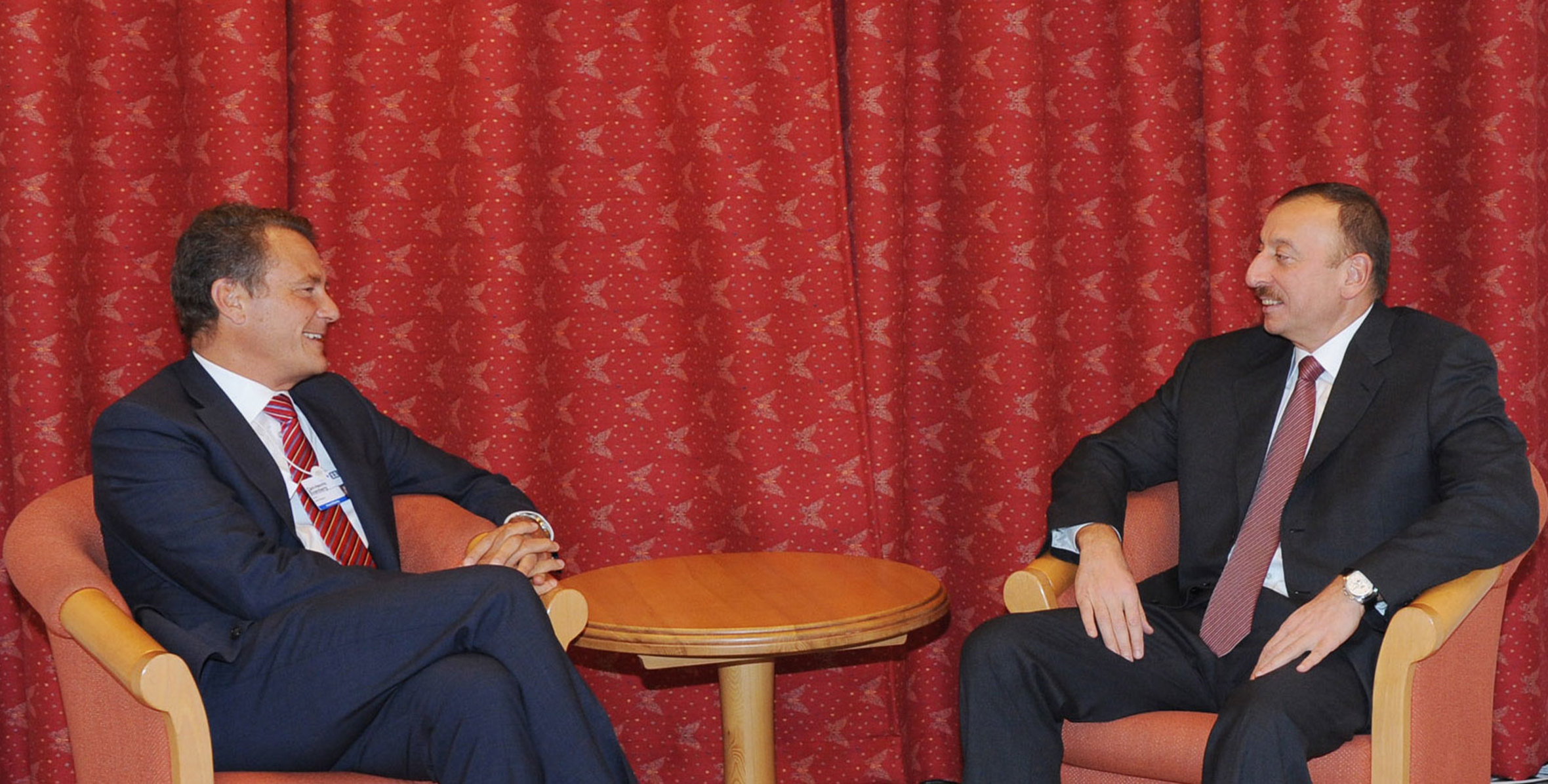
Svanberg meeting with Azerbaijan's President Ilham Aliyev

Svanberg joined the BP board as chairman-designate in September 2009, and succeeded Peter Sutherland as chairman in January 2010.

Svanberg was named the ordförande (chair) of the Sweden's newly formed AI-kommissionen (AI Commission) in December 2023 with the task to deliver a report to the nation by mid-2025. In May 2024, Svanberg announced that his team was bringing the report forward to "mid-autumn 2024, instead of 1 July 2025" to help the nation prepare more rapidly.

He and his wife Agneta, an associate professor at Uppsala University, filed for divorce on 17 September 2009. They were married for 26 years and have three children together. Svanberg is a dedicated fan of Djurgårdens IF and is on the board of Djurgårdens IF Hockey. He is a former ice hockey player himself, having played for IF Björklöven in Umeå during his youth.

Svanberg has received the Lifetime Achievement Award, given out by the security trade magazine Detektor, for his work in Assa Abloy and Securitas, other notable recipients of the award have included Thomas Breglund former CEO of Securitas.

== Deepwater Horizon oil spill ==
In June 2010, Svanberg met with US President Barack Obama to discuss BP's responsibility for the effects of the Deepwater Horizon oil spill. He caused a PR uproar by afterwards expressing BP's concern for the common people along the Gulf Coast of the United States whose livelihood is threatened by the oil spill by saying "we care about the small people", drawing upon the Swedish vi bryr oss om de små människorna. The correct translation of the Swedish phrase would have been "little people". Svanberg subsequently apologized for the term, saying that he had "spoken clumsily".
