= Hans Wermdalen =

Swedish lawyer and former security chief (born 1936)

Hans Wermdalen (born December 30, 1936) is a Swedish lawyer and former security chief.

Wermdalen got district prosecutor's degree at Stockholm University in 1962. He then worked in the police, including as bureau chief of the Swedish Security Service. In 1975 he became Chief Security Officer at Ericsson and founded the trade association Swesec, which he was chairman of between 1982 and 1996. Moreover, he has been vice president at Securitas AB.

Wermdalen has also been active in ASIS International including as chairman of the Swedish chapter, Vice President in Europe, board member and chairman in the board of directors of ASIS International Affairs. When he left the board, he was appointed Lifetime Asis member.

In 2011, Wermdalen received the Lifetime Achievement Award, given out by the security trade magazine Detektor, for his "longstanding commitment to develop the security industry".

== Hans Wermdalens säkerhetsstipendium ==
In 1997, Hans Wermdalen established an award called Hans Wermdalens säkerhetsstipendium whose aim is to "draw attention to innovators of particularly interesting and/or important system solutions, services and products". Since then, the prize is awarded annually by the Swedish security trade association Swesec.

== Books ==
Wermdalen has written the following books:

- Företagen och terrorismen, 1977
- Säkerhetsboken (co-authored with Klas Nilsson), 1992
- ASIS International Sweden 1990-2010 (co-authored with Klas Nilsson), 2010
