= Greenslopes Private Hospital =

- Ramsay Health Care

Geography
- Location: Brisbane, Queensland, Australia
- Coordinates: 27°30′46.39″S 153°2′45.92″E

History
- Founded: 2 February 1942

Links
- Website: www.greenslopesprivate.com.au
- Lists: Hospitals in Australia

Greenslopes Private Hospital is a private health care provider located in Greenslopes, Brisbane, Australia. It was named Australia's Best Private Hospital, 1999 and received the Australian Private Hospitals Association's, Hospital Quality of Excellence Award, 2004.

It is located within the Greenslopes suburb, on a ridge leading east from Stephens Mountain, a low hill still covered in scrub and overlooking Norman Creek to the west. The hospital, surrounded by quiet streets, lies some distance from the nearest main roads, a factor which has caused friction with local residents over traffic, parking and redevelopment issues in recent years.

== History ==
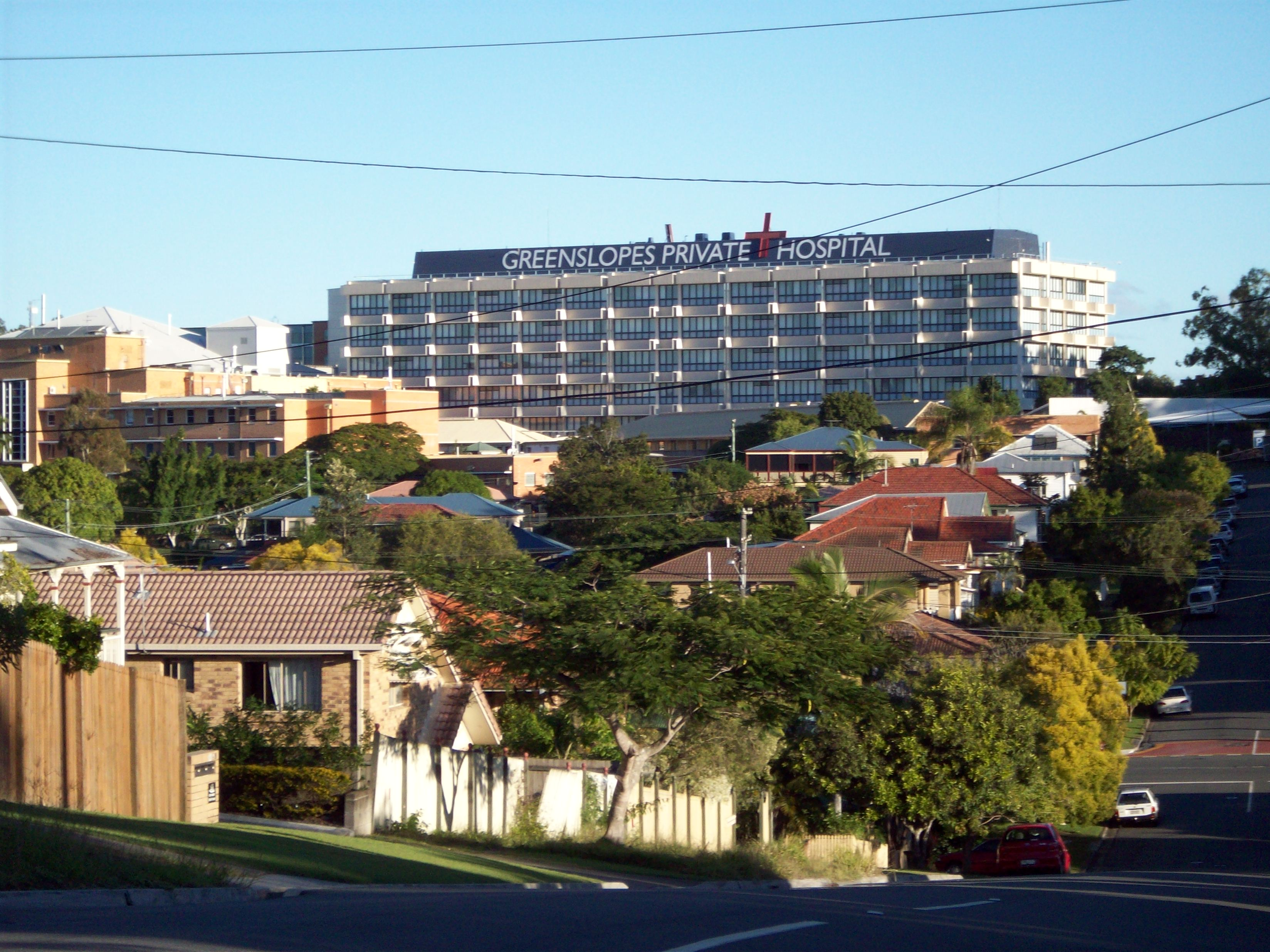
Greenslopes Private Hospital.

The hospital provides care for a large number of patients each year since it opened in 1942 as an Army hospital – 112th Australian General Hospital (AGH) during World War II years. Then later as Repatriation General Hospital (RGH) Greenslopes operated by the Repatriation Commission (now Department of Veterans' Affairs) for war veterans.

In the early 1990s the Commonwealth Government decided to move to be a purchaser of medical services rather than a provider. The Federal Government's preferred option was for state health departments to take over the operations but the Queensland Government of the time turned down the offer. Then in 1994 tenders were called for private operators to purchase the hospital; in September 1994 it was announced that Ramsay Health Care was the successful tenderer. Ramsay Health Care assumed responsibility for Greenslopes Hospital on 6 January 1995.

Timeline

- 1940: Hospital site is chosen for development.
- 1941: Construction begins on the first half of the hospital.
- 1942: 112th Australian General Hospital officially opens on 2 February with the first 35 war patients admitted in March.
- 1943: Hospital expanded with the need for more beds after the Australian Warship 'Centaur' was torpedoed off Moreton Bay.
- 1944: The official Chapel was completed and opened.
- 1946: Hospital now had 900 staff who were caring for up to 1,120 patients.
- 1947: The Repatriation Commission assumed administrative control of the hospital, which was renamed the Repatriation General Hospital, Greenslopes
- 1950s: Hospital expanded once again with new medical, surgical and psychiatric services.
- 1970: Became a university teaching hospital associated with the University of Queensland.
- 1974: Hospital commenced treating members of the general public.
- 1980s: The new multi-storey wing of the hospital was opened.
- 1995: Hospital sold to Ramsay Health Care (6 Jan 1995).
- 1996: Hospital was renamed to Greenslopes Private Hospital (GPH).
- 1999: A new Cardiac Surgery facility was opened.
- 2001: Greenslopes was now pronounced the largest private hospital in Queensland and a new development of a new facility was approved.
- 2003: A new facility, which brought the number of hospital beds to 528, made Greenslopes the largest private hospital in Australia.
- 2006: Construction begins on a new building to house new Private Outpatient Clinics – will almost double the number of outpatient clinics in the hospital.

== War tradition ==
"Over time, the number of war veterans and widows needing care at the Hospital will decline as age takes its toll. However, the spirit of the heroic generations of men and women who have known Greenslopes as their hospital will live on. Today, everyone working at Greenslopes Private Hospital is aware of the special place the hospital has in personal and national histories. Ramsay Health Care has established permanent memorials at the Hospital to host Anzac Day dawn ceremonies and other significant days of remembrance."

== See also ==
- Health care in Australia
- List of hospitals in Australia
- Repatriation General Hospital
