= Greenslopes =

- Suburb
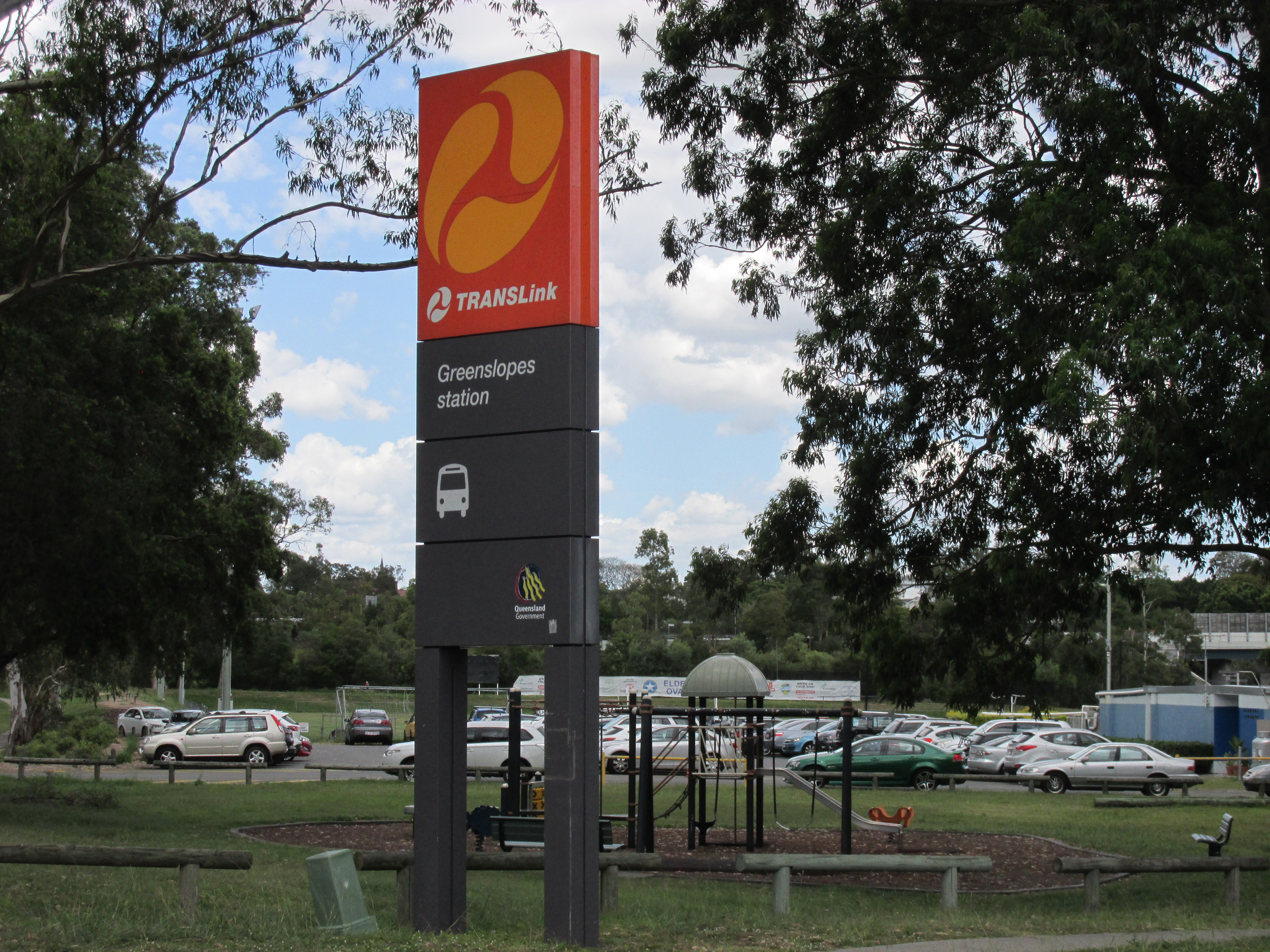
- Greenslopes Busway Station sign inside Ekibin Park

- Interactive map of Greenslopes
- Coordinates: 27.5108°S 153.0486°E
- Country: Australia
- State: Queensland
- City: Brisbane
- LGA: City of Brisbane (Coorparoo Ward)
- Location: 6.0 km (3.7 mi) S of Brisbane CBD

Government
  - State electorate: Greenslopes
  - Federal division: Griffith

Area
  - Total: 2.5 km^{2} (0.97 sq mi)

Population
  - Total: 7,941 (2021 census)
  - Density: 3,180/km^{2} (8,230/sq mi)
- Time zone: UTC+10:00 (AEST)
- Postcode: 4120
Suburbs around Greenslopes
Woolloongabba	Stones Corner	Coorparoo
Annerley	Greenslopes	Holland Park
Annerley	Tarragindi	Holland Park West

Greenslopes is a southern suburb in the City of Brisbane, Queensland, Australia. It is 6.0 kilometres (3.7 mi) by road south of the Brisbane CBD. In the 2021 census, Greenslopes had a population of 7,941 people.

== Geography ==
Greenslopes lies 6.0 kilometres (3.7 mi) by road south of the Brisbane GPO. It is bounded to the west by the Pacific Motorway (also known within Brisbane as the Southeast Freeway) and the South East Busway and to the north by Cornwall Street. The suburb is served by the Greenslopes busway station on Barnsdale Street (27.51108°S 153.04031°E).

Logan Road enters the suburb from the north (Stones Corner) and exits to the south-west (Holland Park West / Holland Park).

Norman Creek enters the suburb from the south-west (Annerley) and exits to the north (Stones Corner); it becomes a tributary of the Brisbane River at East Brisbane / Norman Park. There is some slight variety in the terrain, with low hills in the east and south sloping down to the flood plain of Norman Creek.

The land use is mostly residential with some shops. In the south-west of the locality is the Greenslopes Private Hospital and an Energex office and service centre.

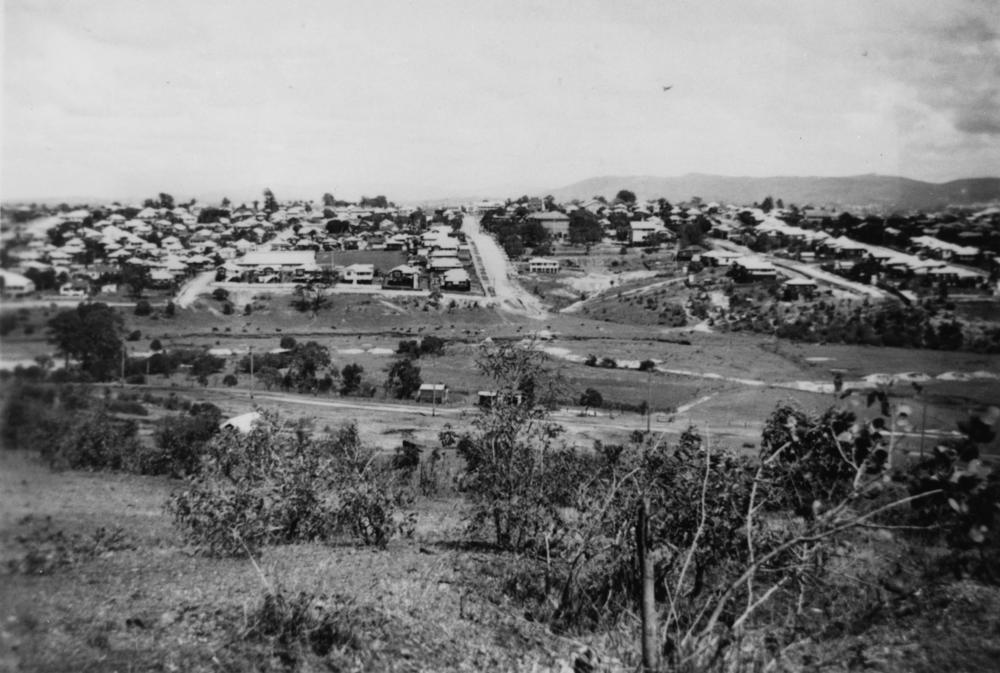
Steven's Mountain, Greenslopes, looking towards Junction Park School, 1940s

Stephens Mountain is the south-west of the suburb, rising to 55 metres (180 ft) (27.5117°S 153.0434°E). It is located between the Greenslopes Private Hospital located on a ridge leading east from its highest point, and the Greenslopes busway station and the Pacific Motorway to the west. The hill is low and its highest points are still covered in scrub.

== History ==
Greenslopes grew up along a bullock track which was developed in the 1850s to link the settlements along the Logan River with the township of Brisbane. This route was pioneered by John Slack (1797–1861), and it was originally known as "Slack's Track" or "Slack's Logan Road." It largely followed an ancient Aboriginal pathway. In December 1857 land in the Greenslopes area was first offered for sale, in large portions, at a reserve price of one pound per acre. Some of these large portions were subdivided in the 1870s and 1880s and sold as residential estates, such as the Baynes' Paddock Estate (around Cornwall and Juliette Streets), the Dunellan Estate (around Dunellan Street), the Hughenden Estate (around Dansie Street), and the Mount Pleasant Estate (around Henzell Terrace and Sackville Street).

Greenslopes was named after an early estate in the area. The estate was owned by Frederick Wecker, who purchased the land in 1857. He grew lucerne on a part of his land that he (or perhaps others) called the "green slopes". The name was used for a real estate development, the "Green Slopes Estate," formed by the 1881 subdivision of land owned by Wecker.

In July 1887, "Baynes' Paddock", comprising 471 allotments, was advertised to be auctioned by Arthur Martin & Co. The allotments for sale were situated along Logan Road; Cornwall Street; Ernest Street; Beatrice Street; Vera Street; Logan Street; Adelaine Street (now Juliette Street); Reuben Street (now Zillah Street); Victor Street (now Flora Street); Arnold Street (now Lincoln Street) and Rita Street (now Regina Street). A map advertising the auction includes a local sketch that shows the nearby bus stands and South Brisbane Railway.

The southern part of Greenslopes saw little development until the opening of the tramline in 1914. The City View Estate (around Ridge Street) was first offered for sale in 1912, and after the First World War many houses were erected here for returned servicemen. The Chatsworth Heights Estate (between Denman Street and Norman Creek) was also first offered for sale in 1912. When the tramline was extended along Logan Road from Chatsworth Road to Arnold Street in 1926, these estates began to develop rapidly.

Until 1925 the section of Greenslopes west of Logan Road formed part of Stephens Shire. The shire's name can still be seen on a plaque on the bridge where Juliette Street crosses Norman Creek. The area east of Logan Road formed part of Coorparoo Shire. In 1925 these shires were amalgamated into Greater Brisbane.

Mount Pleasant Provisional School opened on 30 July 1890 with an enrolment of 65 students. It was renamed Dunellan Provisional School. In 1892 it became Dunellan State School. In 1922 it was renamed Greenslopes State School.

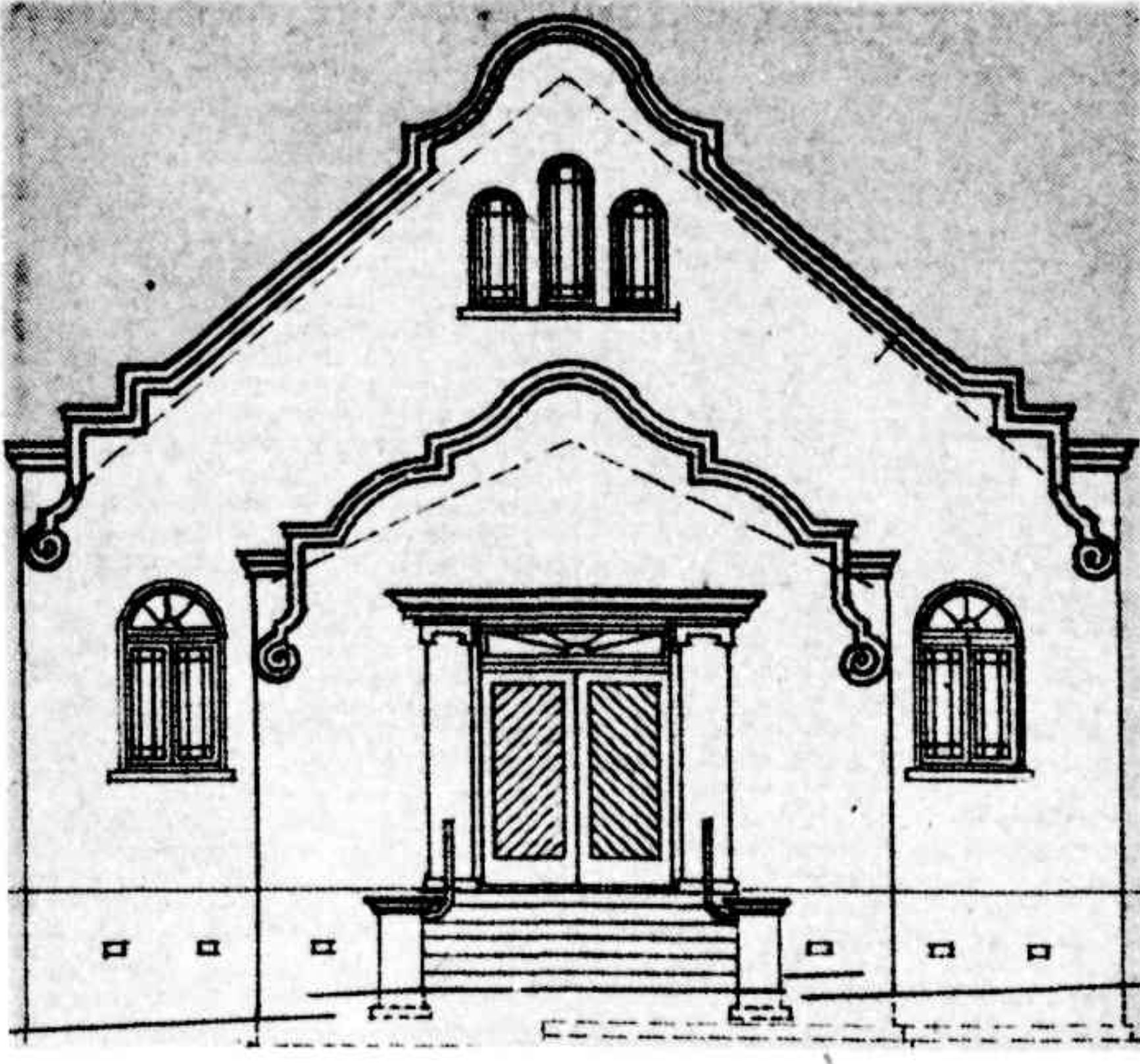
Front elevation of the new brick Baptist church, 1933

In 1900, a small Baptist church was built in Cedar Street. In 1913, it was moved to the north-west corner of Dunellan Street and Henry Street (27.5068°S 153.0482°E). On Saturday 14 October 1933 a new Greenslopes Baptist Church was officially opened on the north-west corner of Dunellan Street and Henry Street. The brick church has a 61 by 31 feet (18.6 by 9.4 m) main room with a seating capacity for 300 people, a 16 by 8 feet (4.9 by 2.4 m) entrance porch, together with a baptistry and vestries for both minister and choir. It is listed on the Brisbane Heritage Register.

The Brisbane City Council operated trams along Logan Road to Greenslopes from 1914 to 13 April 1969. Until 1957 a tram line also operated along Chatsworth Road, branching off the Logan Road line at Greenslopes.

Chatsworth Heights Estate bordering Logan Road was auctioned on the Saturday 14 June 1914.

In October 1925, 23 allotments bordered by Holland Street, Donaldson Street and Curd Street, were advertised to be auctioned by Isles, Love & Co, Limited. A map advertising the auction shows the nearby tram line on Chatsworth Road.

St Matthew's Anglican Church hall opened circa 1936 and closed circa 1968.

In September 1938, "Waratah Estate", made up of eight allotments bordered by Logan Road and Donaldson Street, were advertised to be auctioned by Sharp & Musgrave. A map advertising the auction states that the allotments are on the Holland Park tramline.

In 1942 during World War II, the Repatriation General Hospital (RGH) opened in Greenslopes. It was also known as 112 General Military Hospital (Brisbane). It was operated by the Australian Government though the Department of Veterans Affairs (DVA) to provide healthcare for war veterans. It was Brisbane's first purpose-built military hospital. By the late 1980s, the need for veterans' hospital care was reducing. In 1995, the government sold the hospital to private hospital operator Ramsay Health Care. The arrangement provided for the continued care of veterans in the hospital funded by the Australian Government with the remainder of the hospital's services being available for private patients. The hospital has been expanded with additional buildings allowing a wider range of specialist services to be provided in areas such as cardiac care, day cancer treatments, and robotic surgery. Some of the buildings on the site including the administration block and the chapel are heritage-listed.

In 1975, the suburb of Stones Corner was absorbed into Greenslopes before officially being re-instated as a suburb of its own in November 2017.

Before August 2015, Greenslopes was in the Holland Park Ward (an electorate within the City of Brisbane) but, from August 2015, it became part of the Coorparoo Ward with Annerley, Coorparoo, Camp Hill and Carina Heights.

== Demographics ==
In the 2011 census, Greenslopes had a population of 8,565 residents, of whom 50.8% were female and 49.2% were male. The median age of the population was 32; five years younger than the Australian median. 64.1% of people living in Greenslopes were born in Australia, compared to the national average of 69.8%. The other most common countries of birth were India (4.3%), England (3.2%), New Zealand (3.1%), the Philippines (1.1%), and China (0.8%). 74% of people only spoke English at home, while the next most commonly spoken languages were Punjabi (1.2%), Hindi (1.1%), Mandarin (1.1%), Cantonese (0.9%), and Greek (0.9%). The most common religious affiliation was Catholic (25.7%), followed by "no religion" (25%), Anglican (12%), Uniting Church (3.8%), and Buddhist (3%). The suburb's population density was 2,913/km^{2}, whereas Brisbane's was 140/km^{2}. Most occupied dwellings were apartments (48.7%), followed by separate houses (42.6%).

In the 2016 census, Greenslopes had a population of 8,936 people.

In the 2021 census, Greenslopes had a population of 7,941 people.

== Heritage listings ==
There are a number of heritage-listed sites in Greenslopes:

- De Aar (an interwar house), 80 Chatsworth Road
- Tram Shelter, outside 81 Chatsworth Road (27.5058°S 153.0550°E)
- Greenslopes Baptist Church & Hall, 43 Dunellan Street
- Australian Red Cross Centre, 55 Headfort Street
- Chatsworth, 15 Jordan Street
- Greenslopes State School & Mural, 571 Logan Road
- Fig Tree, outside 634 Logan Road (27.5089°S 153.0522°E)
- Parnwell Residence, 684 Logan Road
- Greenslopes Private Hospital including the main administration block and chapel, 83 Nicholson Street

== Education ==
Greenslopes State School is a government primary (Prep–6) school for boys and girls at 559 Logan Road (27.5066°S 153.0498°E). In 2018, the school had an enrolment of 337 students with 25 teachers (21 full-time equivalent) and 11 non-teaching staff (7 full-time equivalent).

There are no secondary schools in Greenslopes. The nearest government secondary schools are Coorparoo Secondary College in neighbouring Coorparoo to the north-east, Cavendish Road State High School in neighbouring Holland Park to the south-east, and Yeronga State High School in Yeronga to the south-west.

== Facilities ==
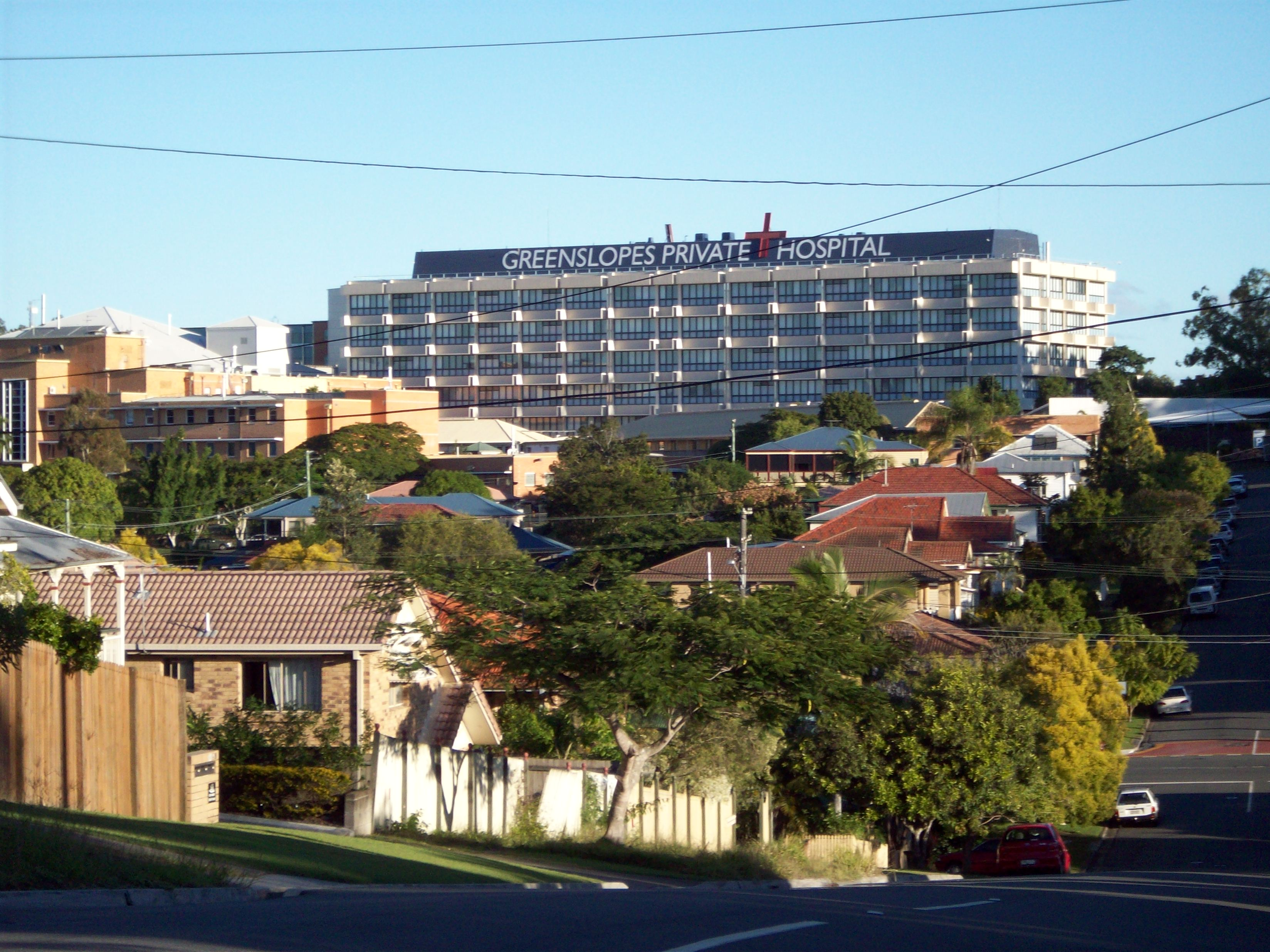
Greenslopes Private Hospital

The Greenslopes Private Hospital is at 121 Newdegate Street (27.5127°S 153.0461°E) and is operated by Ramsay Health Care.

== Amenities ==
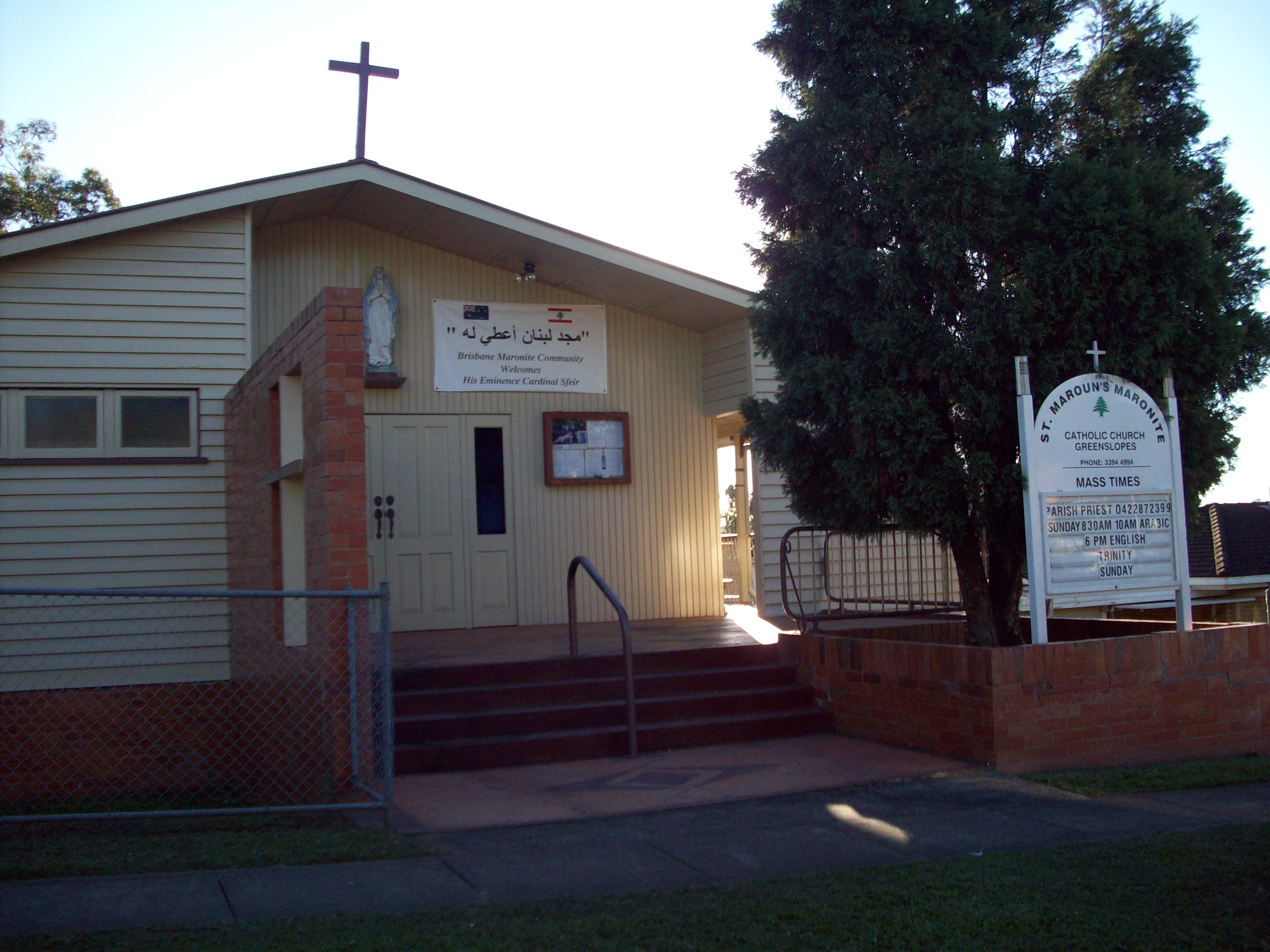
Maronite (Lebanese) Catholic Church in Greenslopes

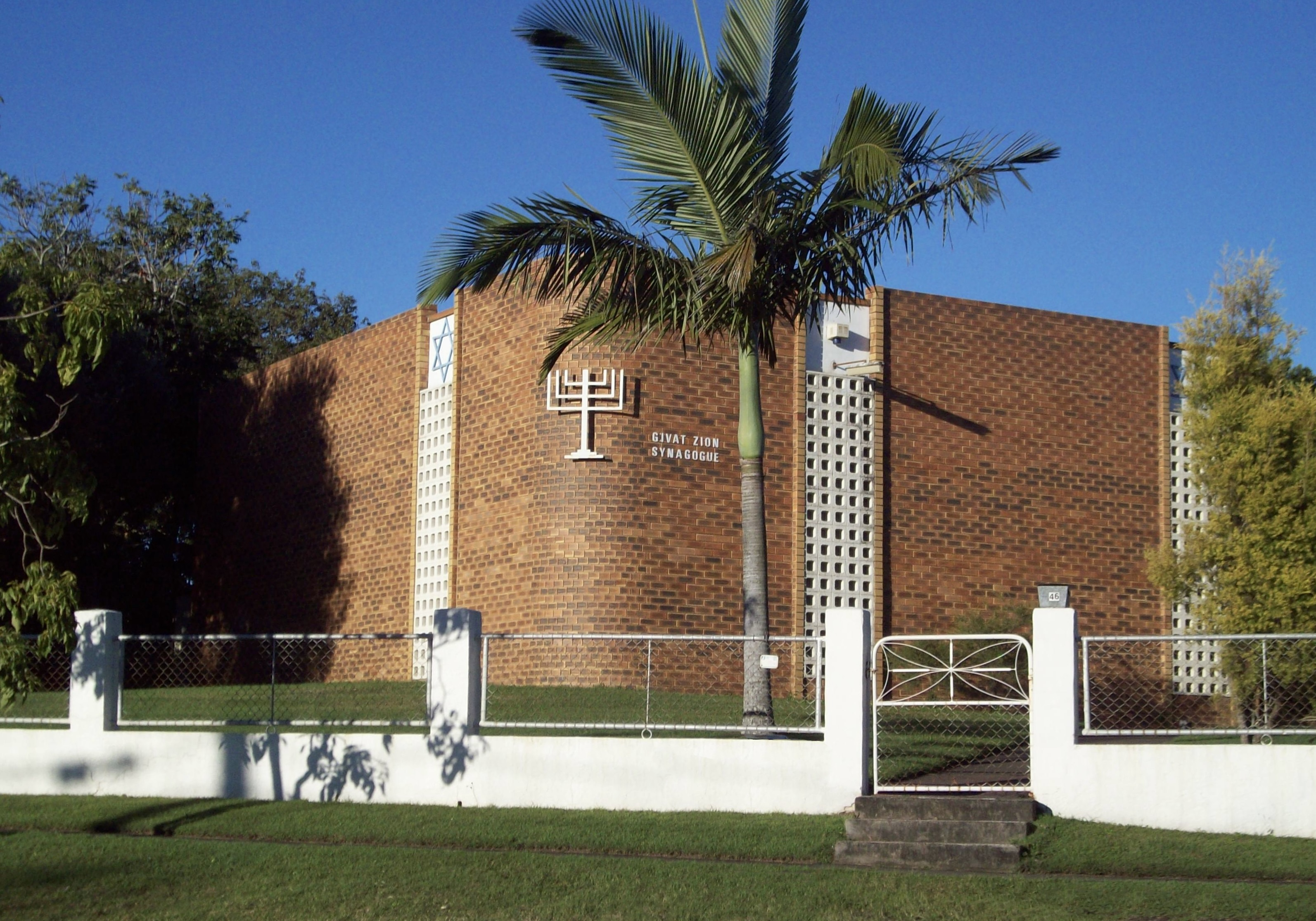
Diva Zion Synagogue in Greenslopes

There are a number of places of worship in Greenslopes, including:

- Greenslopes Baptist Church, corner of Henry and Dunellan Streets (27.5068°S 153.0482°E)
- St Maroun's Maronite Catholic Church, 29 Bunya Street (27.5071°S 153.0460°E) Givat Zion, South Brisbane Hebrew Congregation, 46 Bunya Street (27.5079°S 153.0464°E)

== See also ==
- List of Brisbane suburbs
