= Stones Corner, Queensland =

Stones Corner
- Suburb
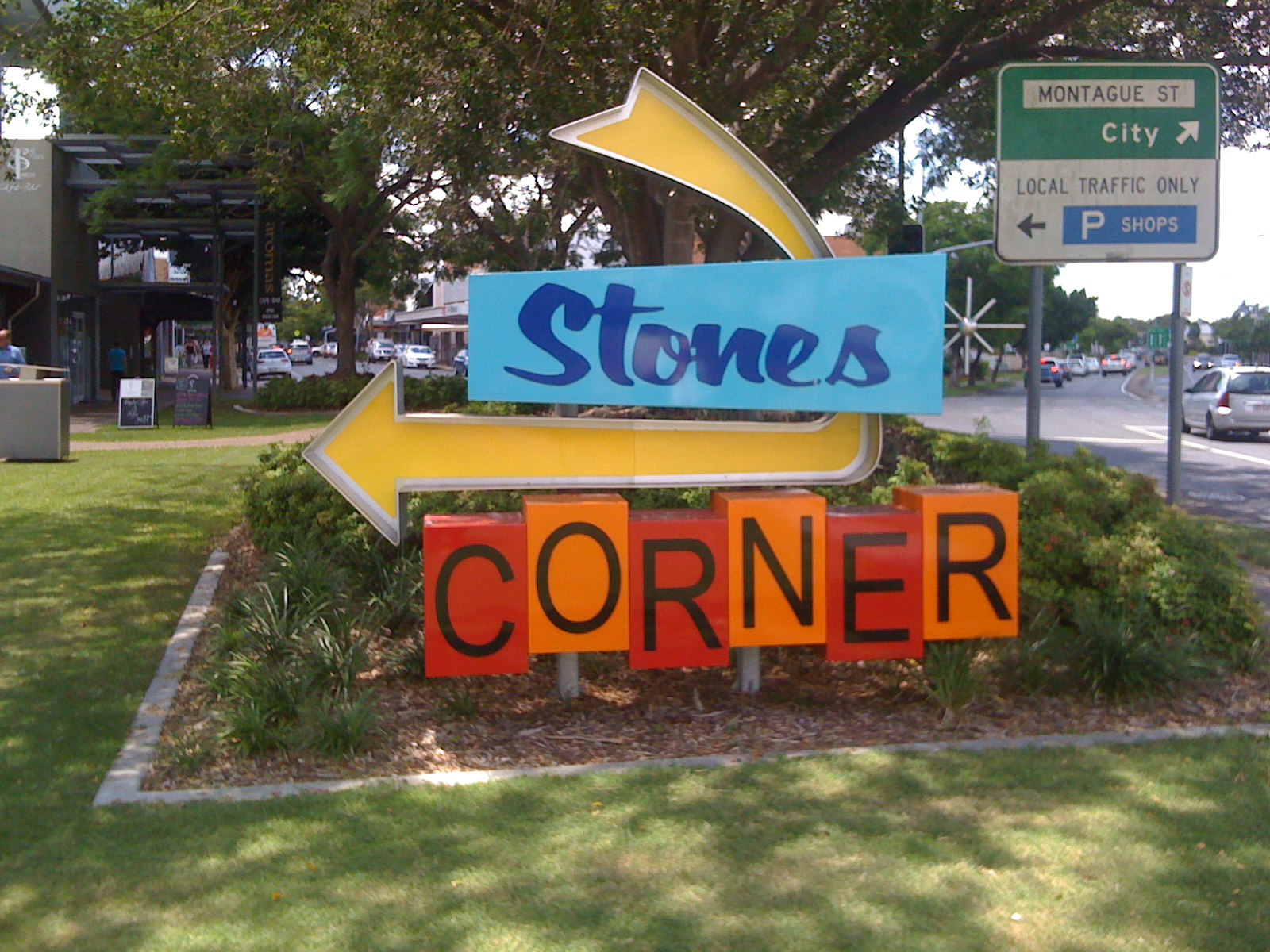
- Stones Corner sign, corner Logan Road and Montague Road, 2015

- Interactive map of Stones Corner
- Coordinates: 27.4988°S 153.0466°E
- Country: Australia
- State: Queensland
- City: Brisbane
- LGA: City of Brisbane
- Location: 5.7 km (3.5 mi) SSE of Brisbane CBD

Government
  - State electorate: Greenslopes
  - Federal division: Griffith

Area
  - Total: 0.6 km^{2} (0.23 sq mi)

Population
  - Total: 2,336 (2021 census)
  - Density: 3,900/km^{2} (10,100/sq mi)
- Time zone: UTC+10:00 (AEST)
- Postcode: 4120
Suburbs around Stones Corner
Woolloongabba	Woolloongabba	Coorparoo
Woolloongabba	Stones Corner	Coorparoo
Greenslopes	Greenslopes	Greenslopes

Stones Corner is an inner southern suburb of City of Brisbane, Queensland, Australia. In the 2021 census, Stones Corner had a population of 2,336 people.

== Geography ==
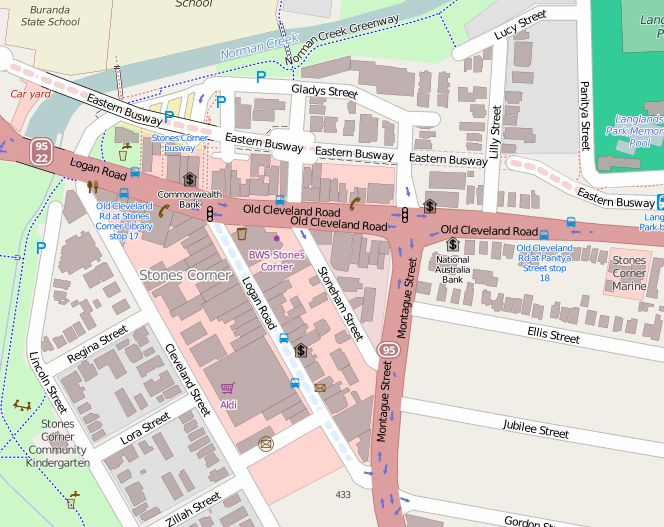
OpenStreetMap - Stones Corner, 2014

Stones Corner is centred on the junction of Logan Road and Old Cleveland Road. One of Brisbane’s oldest open concrete drain was transformed into a 5.2 hectare urban parkland called Hanlon Park / Bur'uda in 2022.

== History ==
The area was originally known as Burnett's Swamp, being low-lying land around the flood-prone Norman Creek. The triangle of land (the "corner") at the south-east of the junction of Logan Road and Old Cleveland Road was purchased by James Stone in 1875. He tried to get a licence to operate a hotel at the location but was unsuccessful so he brewed and sold ginger beer instead. The area took the name Stone's Corner as a result and later became a suburb with that name.

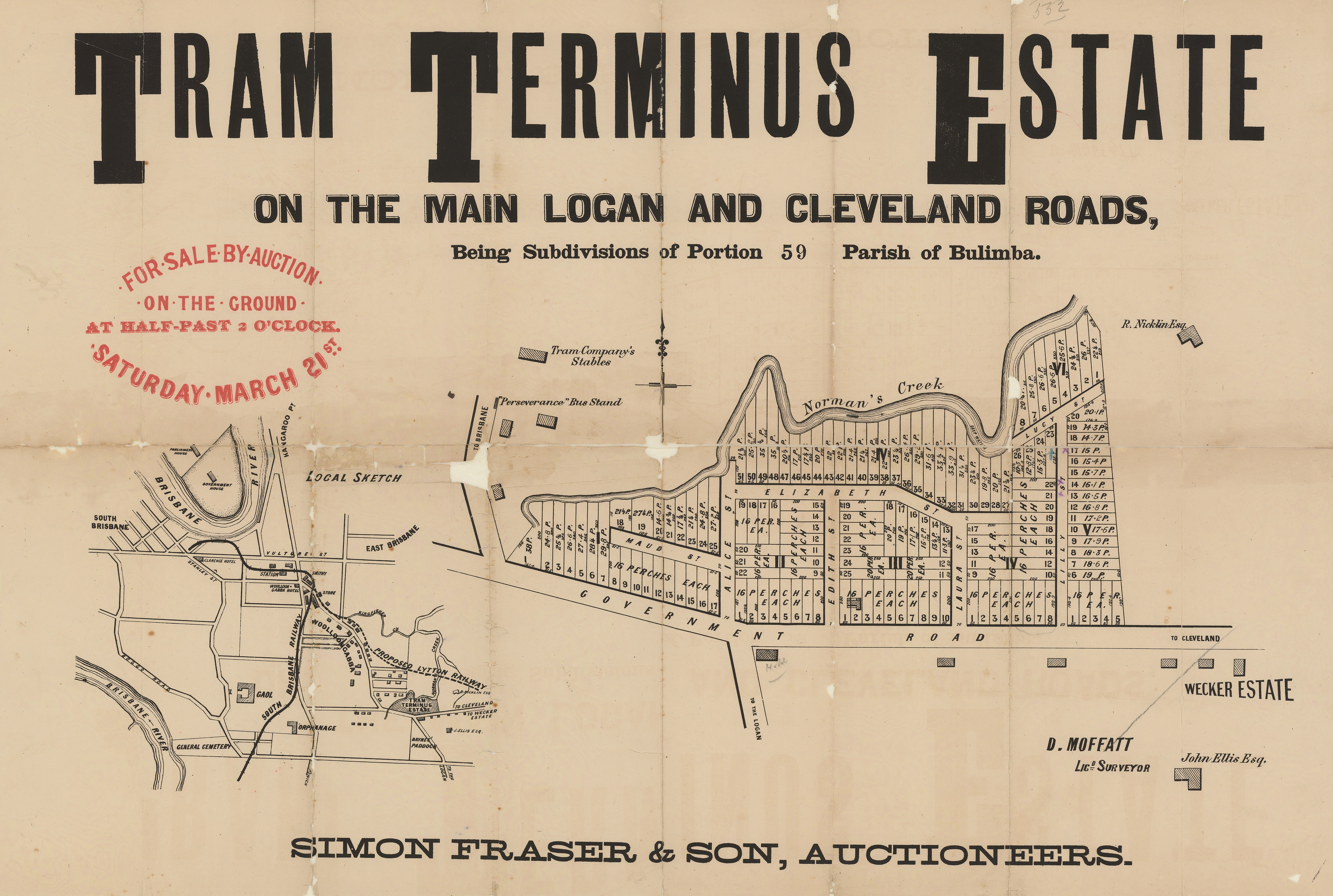
Tram Terminus Estate, on the main Logan and Cleveland Roads, Stones Corner, 1885

In March 1885, the Tram Terminus real estate subdivision was auctioned.

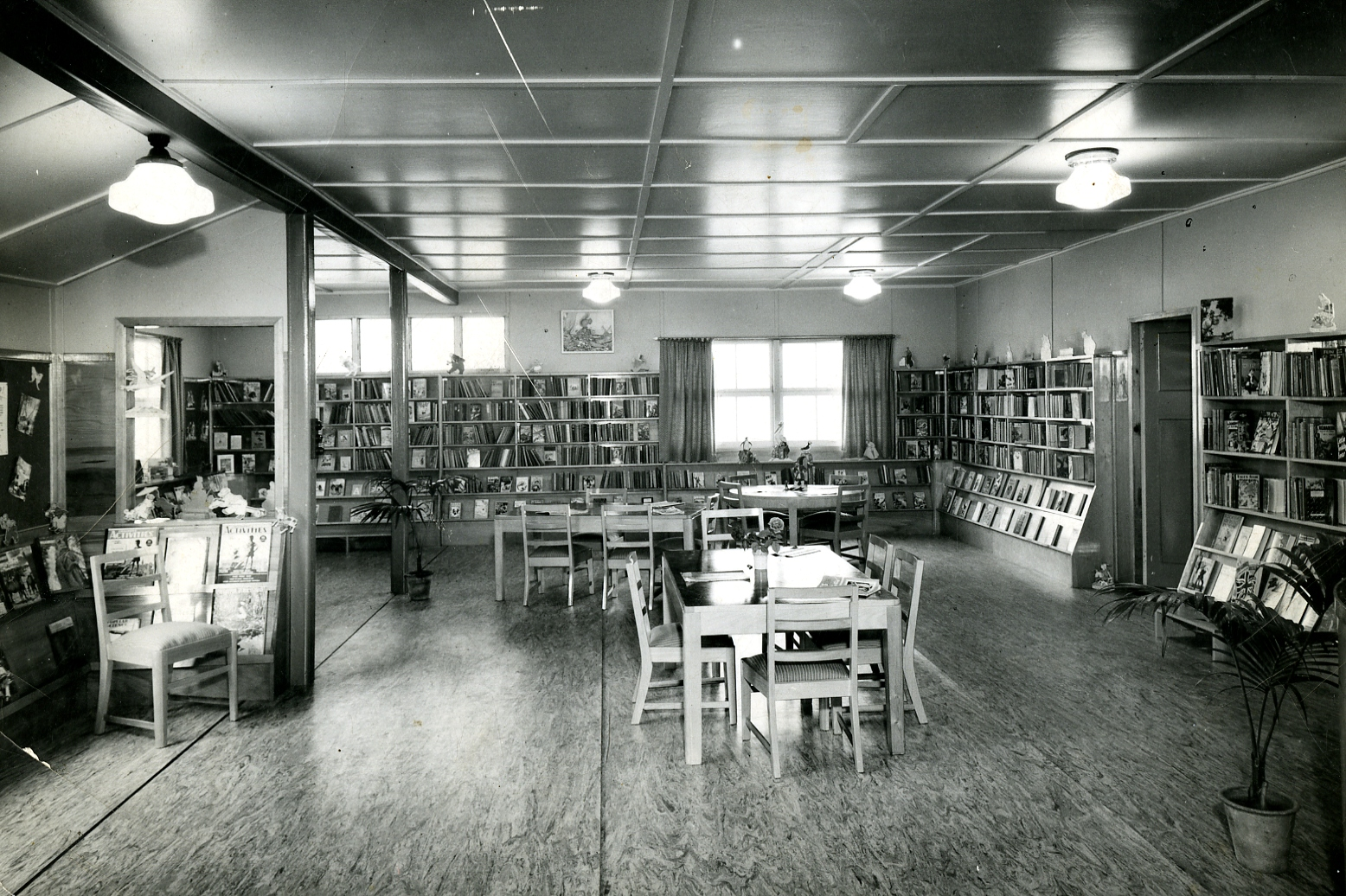
Interior of Stones Corner Library, 1950

In July 1887, Bayne's Paddock was advertised for sale.

The present Stones Corner Hotel was opened on the site in 1888 as the Junction Hotel by Denis O'Connor.

On Sunday 10 August 1913, a new Catholic church at Stones Corner was dedicated by Archbishop James Duhig.

In 1931, the Annerley Church of Christ commenced outreach into Stones Corner, but the initiative was not successful and it ceased after a few years.

Stones Corner Library opened on 25 January 1950. It had a major refurbishment in 1996.

In 1975, the suburb of Stones Corner was absorbed into the neighbouring suburb of Greenslopes before officially returning to a suburb of its own in November 2017.

On 27 August 2024, in Hanlon Park, a nine-month-old baby was the victim of an attack in which an unknown man poured hot coffee over the baby, causing damage to 60 per cent of the baby's body.

== Demographics ==
In the 2021 census, Stones Corner had a population of 2,336 people.

== Education ==
There are no schools in Stones Corner. The nearest government primary schools are Buranda State School in neighbouring Woolloongabba to the west and Greenslopes State School in neighbouring Greenslopes to the south. The nearest government secondary schools are Coorparoo Secondary College in neighbouring Coorparoo to the north-east and Brisbane South State Secondary College in Dutton Park to the west.

== Amenities ==
The Brisbane City Council operates the Stones Corner Library at 280 Logan Road (27.49792°S 153.04369°E).

Hanlon Park / Bur'uda features public parkland, picnic and BBQ areas, public toilets, sport facilities, walking/cycling paths, seating, a nature-themed playground, public art, and areas of native vegetation around a rejuvenated stretch of Norman Creek, which from the 1930s until 2019 had been an open concrete drain. This example of urban rewilding has won several awards.

== Heritage sites ==
- Stones Corner Air Raid Shelter, 286 Logan Road (27.4981°S 153.0436°E)
