= Detektor =

Trade magazine

- Categories: Security
- Frequency: 4/year (International edition); 6/year (Scandinavian edition)
- Circulation: 10 000 (International edition); 11 600 (Scandinavian edition)
- Publisher: AR Media International
- Founder: Lennart Alexandrie
- Founded: 1990
- Country: Sweden
- Language: English (International edition); Swedish, Danish and Norwegian (Scandinavian edition)
- Website: www.detektor.com

Detektor is a Sweden-based trade magazine focusing on the security industry. The magazine has two editions: Detektor Scandinavia, for Scandinavian countries and Detektor International, for the international audience.

== History ==
In 1990 the security publisher AR Media International AB was founded and launched Detektor. At that time Detektor was published exclusively in Swedish. In 1999, a Norwegian edition was established and one year later Detektor International was introduced with a target audience of the security market in Europe, Middle East and Africa. Shortly after that Detektor Sweden and Detektor Norway were merged into a single trilingual magazine called Detektor Scandinavia which also includes the Danish market.

By 2005 Detektor was the most well known and widely read printed security media in both EMEA (Europe, Middle East and Africa) and the Nordic countries according to a report by IMS Research. Two years later Detektor's founder and editor-in-chief Lennart Alexandrie was awarded the Hans Wermdalens säkerhetsstipendium, by the Swedish security trade association Swesec and the educational company Företagsuniversitetet, for the establishment of Detektor and the online publication SecurityWorldMarket.com (then called SecurityWorldHotel.com).

Detektor's Lifetime Achievement Award was established in 2008. Since then the prize has been handed out every year. Notable awardees include Thomas Breglund ex CEO of Securitas, Carl-Henric Svanberg former chairman of BP and president at Assa Abloy, and Martin Gren, founder of Axis Communications.

In 2013, Detektor's founder and editor-in-chief Lennart Alexandrie received the Global Security Industry Alliance's Gold Shield Award for journalism.
