= Capio =

Private healthcare company

- Company type: Private
- Industry: Healthcare
- Headquarters: Gothenburg, Sweden
- Services: Health
- Owners: Ramsay Health Care
- Website: capio.com

Capio is a private healthcare company that provides healthcare in medicine, surgery and psychiatry at health centers, specialist clinics and hospitals in Sweden, Norway, Denmark, Germany and France. The Capio Group was founded in 1994 as a subsidiary of the investment company Bure Equity. In the following years, the company expanded to Norway, the United Kingdom, France and Germany.

Since November 2018, Capio is part of Ramsay Générale de Santé, creating a provider of healthcare services in Europe with combined net sales of EUR 3.8 billion and approximately 36,000 employees. The healthcare operations in France is since operating under the Ramsay Santé brand. Thomas Berglund was the company's President and CEO for 10 years, till 2018.
