= Paul Ramsay =

Australian businessman and philanthropist (1936–2014)

Paul Ramsay AO
- Born: Paul Joseph Ramsay; 5 January 1936; Sydney, New South Wales, Australia
- Died: 1 May 2014 (aged 78); Bowral, New South Wales, Australia
- Education: St Ignatius College, Riverview
- Occupations: Businessman, philanthropist
- Known for: Founder of Ramsay Health Care
- Website: paulramsayfoundation.org.au/our-founder/

Paul Joseph Ramsay AO (5 January 1936 – 1 May 2014) was an Australian businessman and philanthropist.

== Early life and career ==
Born in Sydney, Ramsay grew up in Burradoo in the Southern Highlands, New South Wales.

In 1964, he founded one of the first private psychiatric hospitals in Sydney. It evolved into Ramsay Health Care, a private hospital company of which he was chairman of the board. As of July 2014 it comprised 151 hospitals and day surgery facilities in Australia, Europe and Asia. He was one of the initiators of television aggregation in Australia and built stations across the country, which today form part of the PRIME7 Television Network. Ramsay was chairman of Prime Media Group for almost 30 years until relinquishing this role in April 2014. He sat on the board of directors of Adstream and on the advisory board of the Australian Science Media Centre.

== Personal life ==
Ramsay attended St Ignatius' College, Riverview. During his lifetime, he donated $2.1million toward the Riverview Bursary Program and various capital works, including the new boathouse and Ramsay Hall, both eponymously named after his brother, the distinguished Jesuit, Fr John X Ramsay SJ.

In 2009, he was appointed chairman of Sydney FC. He also owned luxury real estate. He served on the board of the George Gregan Foundation. He was chairman of Ramsay Youth Services, a charity for young people. He sat on the Board of the Gallipoli Medical Research Foundation. In 2002, he became an Officer of the Order of Australia for his philanthropy. In June of the same year, he was on the Queen's Birthday Honours List. In 2011, he donated AUS$300,000 to the Kevin Spacey Foundation.

In 2006 he founded the philanthropic Paul Ramsay Foundation.

Prior to his death, in 2014 his net worth was estimated by Forbes at US$3.4 billion. He was the thirteenth richest person in Australia.

He died single having never married aged 78 on 1 May 2014 in his Bowral home after suffering a heart attack in Spain.

In his will, updated just months before his death, Paul Ramsay left the majority of his estate to the Paul Ramsay Foundation.

== Legacy ==
=== Paul Ramsay Foundation ===
Paul Ramsay's $3 billion bequest made the Paul Ramsay Foundation the largest philanthropic foundation in Australia.

The Foundation's core ambition is states "to help break the cycle of disadvantage". In 2015, the Paul Ramsay Foundation made a $14.7 million donation to the Black Dog Institute for suicide prevention programs. In 2016, the Foundation donated $45.2 million, making it the largest private donor in Australia.

Former University of Melbourne Vice-Chancellor, Professor Glyn Davis AC was appointed CEO of the Paul Ramsay Foundation in January 2019.

=== Ramsay Centre for Western Civilisation ===
In 2017, the Ramsay Centre for Western Civilisation was launched, funded by a bequest by Ramsay, who had "wanted a significant part of his personal fortune to be spent on funding an academic centre to revive the liberal arts and humanities". The bequest was the "biggest philanthropic gift in the history of education in Australia" and the centre, headed by Simon Haines, formerly professor of English at the Chinese University of Hong Kong, was launched by the former Australian Prime Minister John Howard.

In June 2018, the Australian National University (ANU) pulled out of the proposed multimillion-dollar Western Civilisation degree citing concerns about integrity. The ANU's Vice-chancellor stated that the university had "approached the opportunity offered by the Ramsay Centre in a positive and open spirit". The president of the ANU branch of the National Tertiary Education Union, Matthew King, stated that he was concerned that the degree would "pursue a narrow, radically conservative program to demonstrate and promulgate the alleged superiority of western culture and civilisation". In reply, Elizabeth Stone, member of the Ramsay Centre board and Queenwood principal, argued: "The great philosophies and books and thinkers and histories of particular civilisations, in this case the West, are worthy of study, as are Indian civilisations or Asian civilisations." Robert Phiddian, a professor of English at Flinders University and founding director of the Australasian Consortium of Humanities Research Centres, stated that "the Ramsay bequest is the biggest opportunity the humanities in Australia have experienced since the rapid expansion of universities in the 1960s and 70s".

In June 2019, the Council of Wollongong University approved a new course, Bachelor of Arts in Western Civilisation and associated double degree programs, due to commence in 2020. The agreement between the Ramsay Centre and the university was criticised as lacking consultation with staff and the approval of the university's senate. A new School of Liberal Arts was created within the Faculty of Arts, Social Sciences and Humanities, headed by Senior Professor Dr. Daniel D. Hutto.
