= Thomas Berglund (corporate executive) =

Swedish corporate executive (born 1952)

- Born: 18 June 1952

Thomas Fredrik Berglund (born 1952) is a Swedish corporate executive. He was President and Chief Executive Officer of Securitas for 14 years, till April 2007. Berglund has been the deputy Chairman of ISS A/S since 2014, and AcadeMedia since 2017. He was Chairman of Eltel Networks for 4 years till 2012, and was Chairman of Securitas Direct. He was President and Chief Executive Officer of hospital group Capio for 10 years, till 2018.

He graduated in 1978 from the Stockholm School of Economics, and initially worked as an advisor to the Swedish government.

On 22 February 1999, during his tenure as CEO, Securitas became the world's largest security company when it acquired Pinkerton for $384 million, Berglund stated at the time that "this merger is a dramatic milestone for the security industry," increasing his company's revenue to $3.5 billion and employing 114,000 staff in 30 countries. Later that year, in December 1999 he oversaw the purchase of two more American security firms for $202 million in cash.

With Berglund at the helm of the company, Securitas's revenue grew from $750 million (7 billion SEK) to $7 billion (66 billion SEK), and grew to employ over 250,000 people.

He was the Securitas chief at the time of the high profile Securitas depot robbery, at Tonbridge, Kent when on 22 February 2006, over $92 million (£53,116,760) in cash bank notes belonging to the Bank of England was stolen. It was the largest known cash robbery in the world during peacetime, and only eclipsed by the wartime $1 billion cash heist done at the Central Bank of Iraq, under orders of Saddam Hussein by his son Qusay in 2003.

In 2012, Berglund was a recipient of the Lifetime Achievement Award, given out by the security trade magazine Detektor, other notable recipients of the award have included Carl-Henric Svanberg former chairman of BP.
