= Ramsay Health Care =

Australian multinational healthcare provider

Ramsay Health Care Limited
- Type: Public
- Traded as: ASX: RHC
- Industry: Healthcare
- Founded: 1964
- Founder: Paul Ramsay
- Headquarters: Sydney, Australia
- Number of locations: ~500
- Area served: Australia, United Kingdom, France, Sweden, Norway, Denmark, Germany, Indonesia, Malaysia, Hong Kong, Italy
- Key people: David Thodey (Chairman); Natalie Davis (CEO); Anthony Neilson (CFO); John Doulis (CTO)
- Services: Hospitals; Day surgery; Clinics; Pharmacies
- Revenue: ▲ A$12.456 billion (2021)
- Net income: ▲ A$449 million (2021)
- Total assets: ▲ A$18.059 billion (2020)
- Total equity: ▲ A$4.236 billion (2020)
- Number of employees: ~80,000
- Divisions: Ramsay Health Care UK; Ramsay Santé (52.5%); Ramsay Sime Darby Health Care (50%); Ramsay Pharmacy
- Website: www.ramsayhealth.com

Ramsay Health Care Limited is an Australian multinational healthcare provider and hospital network, founded by Paul Ramsay in Sydney, Australia, in 1964. The company operates in Australia, Europe, the UK, and Asia, specialising in surgery, rehabilitation, and psychiatric care.

Natalie Davis has been the Group CEO since December 2024.

== History ==
The organisation was founded in Sydney, Australia, in 1964 by Paul Ramsay.

In 1997, the organisation went public on the Australian Stock Exchange. The Ramsay group grew into one of the largest private hospital operators in the world, with over 400 hospitals located in Australia, England, France, Indonesia, and Malaysia.

== Ramsay Australia ==
=== Hospitals and facilities run by Ramsay ===
- New South Wales
  - Albury Wodonga Private Hospital, West Albury
  - Armidale Private Hospital, Armidale
  - Ballina Day Surgery, Ballina
  - Baringa Private Hospital, Coffs Harbour
  - Berkeley Vale Private Hospital, Berkeley Vale
  - Castlecrag Private Hospital, Castlecrag
  - Coolenberg Day Surgery, Port Macquarie
  - Dudley Private Hospital, Orange
  - Figtree Private Hospital, Figtree
  - Hunters Hill Private Hospital, Hunters Hill
  - Kareena Private Hospital, Caringbah
  - Kingsway Day Surgery, Miranda
  - Lake Macquarie Private Hospital, Gateshead
  - Lawrence Hargrave Private Hospital, Thirroul
  - Mt Wilga Private Hospital, Hornsby (see Mount Wilga House)
  - North Shore Private Hospital, St Leonards
  - Northside Group
    - St Leonards Clinic, St Leonards
    - Cremorne Clinic, Cremorne
    - Macarthur Clinic, Campbelltown
    - Wentworthville Clinic, Wentworthville
  - Nowra Private Hospital, Nowra
  - Port Macquarie Private Hospital, Port Macquarie
  - Southern Highlands Private Hospital, Bowral
  - St George Private Hospital, Kogarah
  - Strathfield Private Hospital, Strathfield
  - Tamara Private Hospital, Tamworth
  - The Border Cancer Hospital, Albury
  - Warners Bay Private Hospital, Warners Bay
  - Western Sydney Oncology, Westmead
  - Westmead Private Hospital, Westmead
  - Wollongong Private Hospital, Wollongong
- Queensland
  - Caboolture Private Hospital, Caboolture
  - Cairns Day Surgery, Cairns
  - Cairns Private Hospital, Cairns
  - Caloundra Private Hospital, Caloundra
  - Greenslopes Private Hospital, Greenslopes
  - Hillcrest Rockhampton Private Hospital, Rockhampton
  - John Flynn Private Hospital, Tugun
  - Nambour Selangor Private Hospital, Nambour
  - New Farm Clinic, New Farm
  - Noosa Hospital, Noosaville
  - North West Private Hospital, Everton Park
  - Pindara Day Surgery, Benowa
  - Pindara Private Hospital, Benowa
  - Short Street Day Surgery, Southport
  - Southport Private Hospital, Southport
  - St Andrew's Ipswich Private Hospital, Ipswich
  - Sunshine Coast University Private Hospital, Birtinya
  - The Cairns Clinic, Cairns
- South Australia
  - Adelaide Clinic, Gilberton
  - Kahlyn Day Centre, Magill
- Victoria
  - Albert Road Clinic, Melbourne
  - Beleura Private Hospital, Mornington
  - Donvale Rehabilitation Hospital, Donvale
  - Frances Perry House, Parkville
  - Glenferrie Private Hospital, Hawthorn
  - Linacre Private Hospital, Hampton
  - Masada Private Hospital, St Kilda East
  - Mitcham Private Hospital, Mitcham
  - Murray Valley Private Hospital, Wodonga
  - Peninsula Private Hospital, Frankston
  - Shepparton Private Hospital, Shepparton
  - The Avenue Hospital, Windsor
  - Warringal Private Hospital, Heidelberg
  - Waverley Private Hospital, Mount Waverley
- Western Australia
  - Attadale Rehabilitation Hospital, Attadale
  - Glengarry Private Hospital, Duncraig
  - Hollywood Private Hospital, Nedlands
  - Joondalup Health Campus, Joondalup
  - Joondalup Private Hospital, Joondalup
  - The Hollywood Clinic, Nedlands

== Asia ==
=== Ramsay Sime Darby ===
Paul Ramsay signed a joint venture in March 2013 with Malaysian conglomerate Sime Darby to combine Ramsay's three Indonesian hospitals with Sime's three in Malaysia, with plans to expand throughout Southeast Asia. The venture has since expanded to an additional day surgery in Hong Kong and a nursing college in Malaysia.

== Europe ==
=== Capio ===
Capio is the Scandinavian division of Ramsay Health Care, having been acquired by Ramsay Santé in 2018.

=== Ramsay Santé ===
Ramsay Health Care first acquired hospitals in France in 2010 and together with its partner Crédit Agricole Assurances, grew to a total of 40 hospitals across France, before acquiring a controlling interest in the market leader – Générale de Santé and its 75 facilities in 2014.

Ramsay Générale de Santé is the largest private hospital group in France with 121 facilities (110 hospitals) making it the market leader in that country.

=== Ramsay UK ===
Ramsay Health Care UK - a network of 22 private UK hospitals, 9 treatment centres and 3 neurological units, offering a range of treatments from hip replacements to knee replacement surgery and cosmetic surgery to weight loss surgery. It provides a number of Independent sector treatment centres for the English NHS. In 2007, Capio was acquired by Ramsay Health Care.

== See also ==
- Health care in Australia
- Health care in the United Kingdom
- Health care in Europe
- Healthcare in Malaysia
- Healthcare in Indonesia
- List of hospitals in Australia
