= Mount Gravatt Cemetery and Crematorium =

Cemetery and crematorium in Brisbane, Queensland, Australia

- Interactive map of Mount Gravatt Cemetery and Crematorium

Details
- Established: 1918
- Location: Nathan, Queensland
- Country: Australia
- Coordinates: 27.5541°S 153.0660°E
- Owned by: Brisbane City Council
- Size: 80 ha (200 acres)
- Website: Mt Gravatt Cemetery
- Find a Grave: Mount Gravatt Cemetery and Crematorium

The Mount Gravatt Cemetery and Crematorium is a cemetery and crematorium located at 620 Mains Road, Nathan, Brisbane, Australia. It is operated by the City of Brisbane.

The reserve adjoins the Queensland Sport and Athletics Centre, Griffith University, and Toohey Forest Park.

== History ==
The land was originally part of the holdings of pioneer South Brisbane land baron James Toohey. Lot 392 of grazing land was resumed by the government for non-payment of taxes in 1913, purchased for £800 (about A$69,500 in 2020). The cemetery opened in 1918.

In 1937, the Brisbane City Council acquired a large portion of the cemetery reserve along Kessels Road; much becoming part of the university after 1965.

The crematorium was opened in 1999.

== Burial and cremation options ==
Unlike many cemeteries in Brisbane, Mount Gravatt is still open with new burial sites available. The cemetery offers lawn and lawn beam memorials and traditional headstones. Ashes can be placed in niches, or buried or scattered in gardens.

== Notable people ==
Notable people buried at Mount Gravatt include:

- Roy Armstrong (1914–1991), Queensland state politician
- Felix Dittmer (1904–1977), Queensland state politician
- Alfred Dohring (1896–1982), Queensland state politician
- Kevin Hooper (1928–1984), Queensland state politician
- Clive Hughes (1924–2014), Queensland state politician
- Alec Lamont (1850–1934), Queensland state politician
- William Maxwell (1867–1921), Queensland state politician
- Robert Nimmo (1893–1966), lieutenant-general
- James Toohey (1827–1883), South Brisbane land owner, and his family members.

== War graves ==
The cemetery contains war graves of six Commonwealth service personnel of World War II.

== Gallery ==
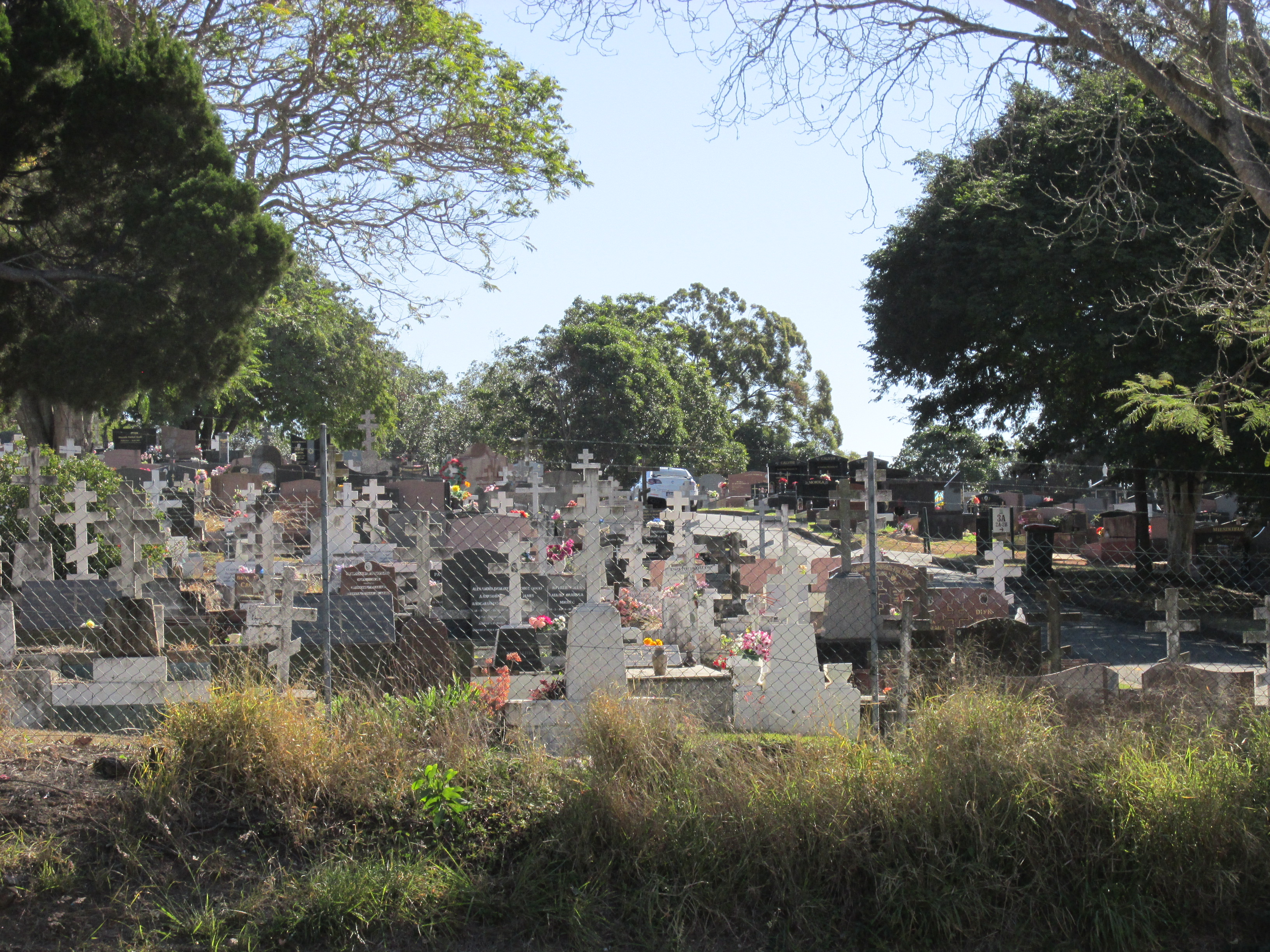
Mount Gravatt Cemetery, seen from Mains Road through a fence (2018).

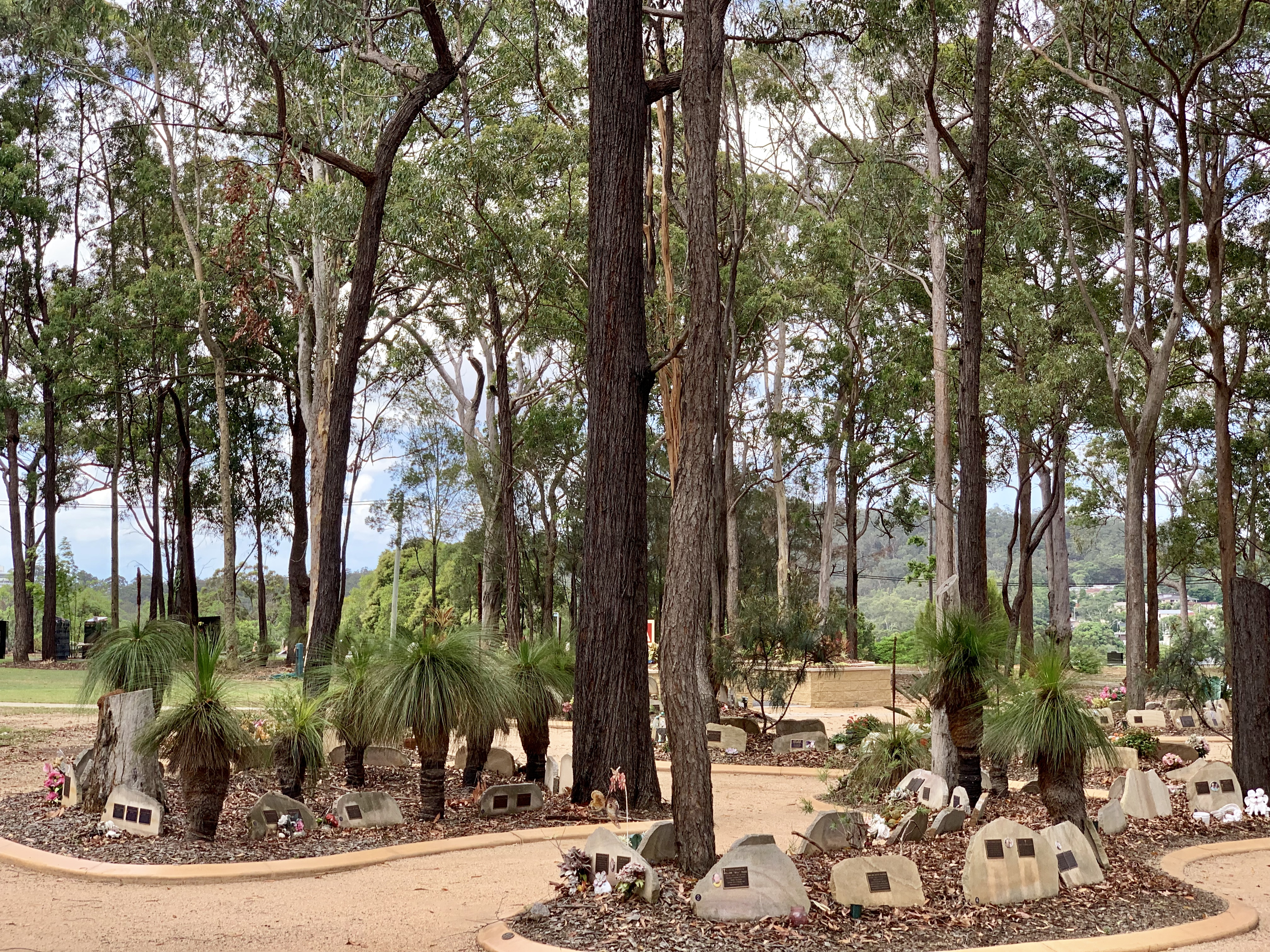
Mount Gravatt Cemetery (2019).
