= Norman Creek (Queensland) =

Coordinates: 27°28′52″S 153°03′09.9″E

Norman
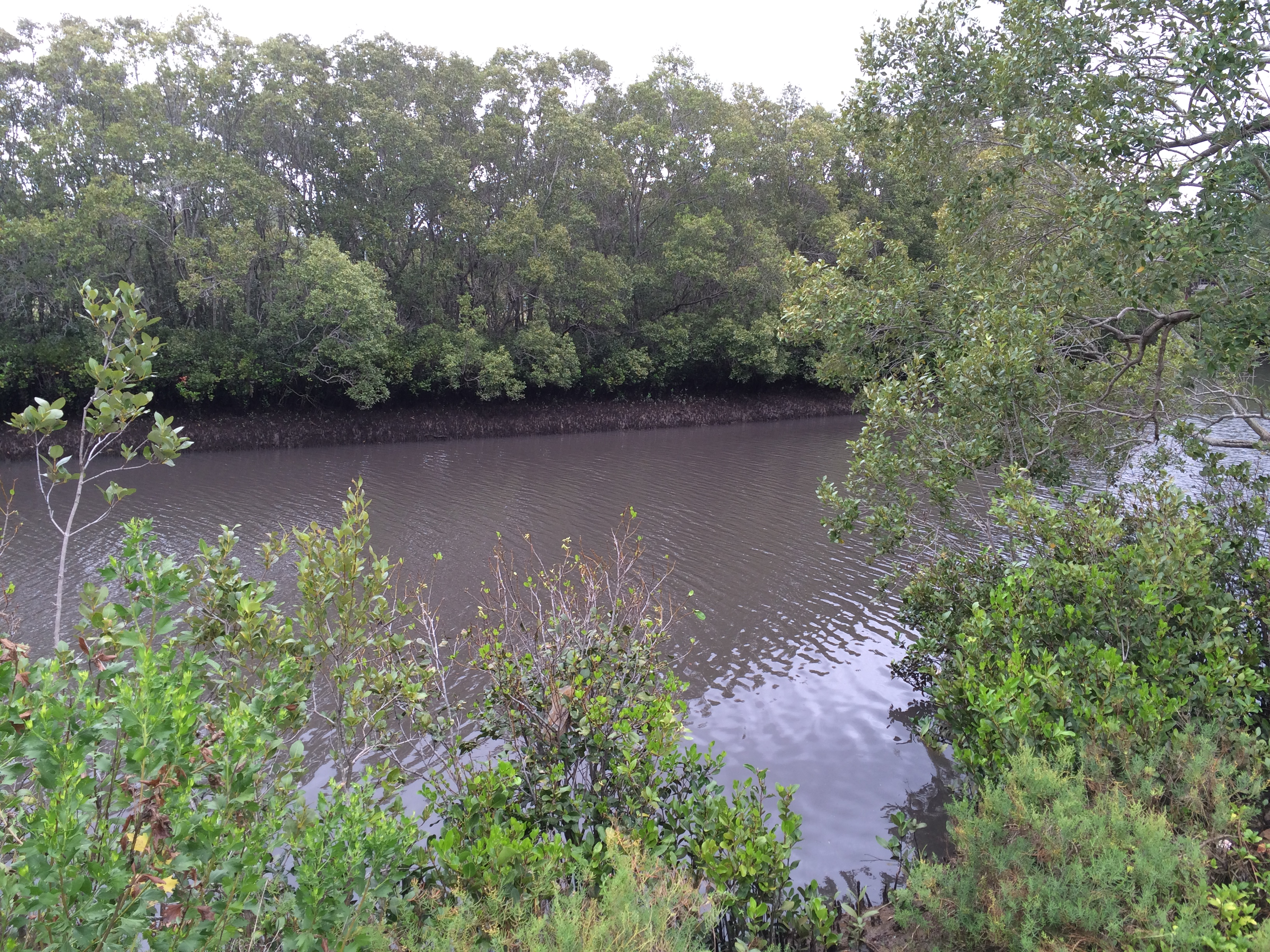
- Norman Creek viewed from Norman Park, 2016

Location
- Country: Australia
- State: Queensland
- Region: South East Queensland
- City: Brisbane

Physical characteristics
- Source: Toohey Mountain
- Mouth: Confluence with the Brisbane River
  - location: East Brisbane

Basin features
- River system: Brisbane River
- Tributaries
  - left: Sandy Creek (Queensland)
  - right: Ekibin Creek

Norman Creek is a tributary of the Brisbane River in the City of Brisbane, Queensland, Australia. The headwaters of the creek are located on the northern slopes of Toohey Mountain and Mount Gravatt in southern Brisbane.

== Origin of the name ==
The name of the name is disputed.

One claim is that Edmund Lockyer named the waterway Norman Creek in 1825, after Colour-Sergeant John Norman of the 40th Regiment during this detachment's movement from Redcliffe to Brisbane in 1825.

Another claim is that it derives from a corruption of Gorman's Creek which appears in a 1846 atlas, named after Lieutenant Owen Gorman, of H. M. 8th Foot - the last commandant of the Moreton Bay penal settlement.

== Geography ==
Drainage in Tarragindi

The creek drains the suburbs of Tarragindi and Holland Park West then flows northwards through Greenslopes, Norman Park and East Brisbane before entering the Brisbane River at Humbug Reach.

The total catchment area is 29.8 square kilometres (11.5 sq mi). Coorparoo Creek in Coorparoo is a sub-catchment of Norman Creek. Other sub-catchments include Sandy Creek and Ekibin Creek. There are four significant bridges that cross the creek.

At Stones Corner the tidal part of the creek funnels out into a thin gully. From here south, parts of the creek have been channelised into cement drains.

Invasion by weeds, the dumping of rubbish and in the past, sewage discharges have posed problems for the environmental health of this highly urbanised waterway. Volunteer conservation groups are attempting to redress the problems.

Brisbane City Council (BCC) is currently developing a master plan called "Norman Creek 2026" for the catchment. Community feedback and genuine actioning is critical for the success of the project to be able to deliver a healthy ecosystem.

In March 2011, the BCC announced $14.5 million worth of funding to make the creek more resistant to the threat of flooding and to improve the landscape along its course.

The junction of Sandy and Norman Creeks.

The Eastern Busway at Stones Corner is built over the creek. The Anglican Church Grammar School backs onto the creek.

The construction of floodgates at the mouth of the creek has been suggested by a local emeritus professor, in order to stop flooding of the Brisbane River pushing into the creeks and stormwater drains which flow into Norman Creek.

== See also ==
- Bulimba Creek
- Oxley Creek
