= Moorooka State School =

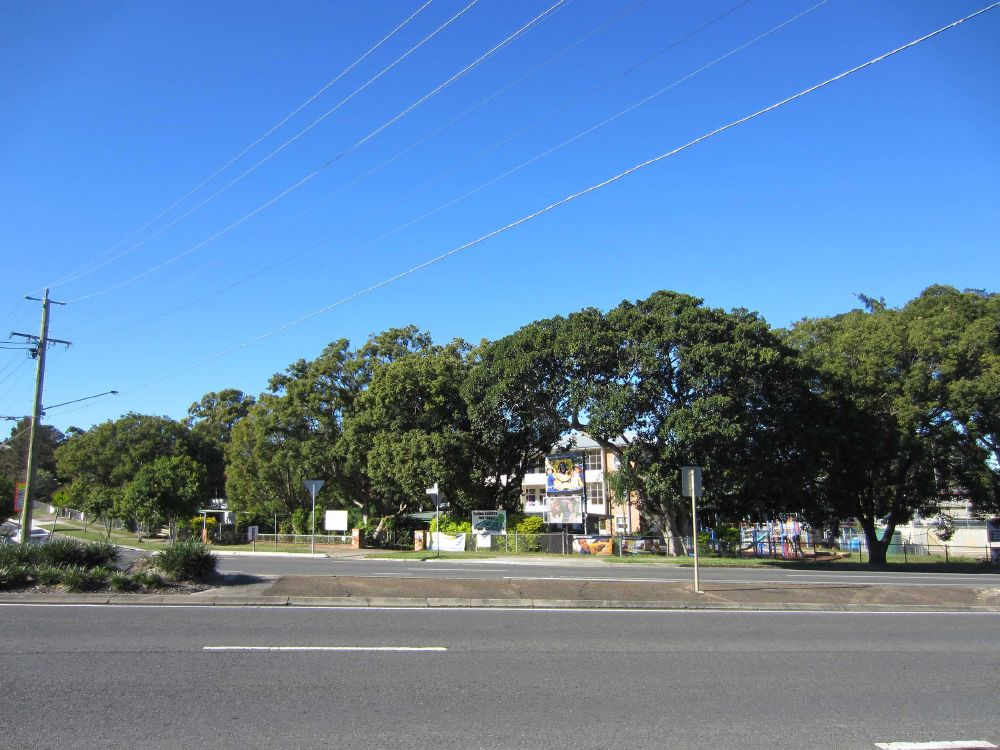
- Moorooka State School, as seen from Beaudesert Road, 2015

- Location within Queensland
- 27.5361°S 153.0240°E
- Location: Sherley Street, Moorooka, City of Brisbane, Queensland, Australia

History
- Design period: 1919–1930s (Interwar period)
- Built: 1928–1929, 1932–1933, 1933–1956, 1946–1964, 1946, 1955–1956

Site notes
- Architect(s): Department of Public Works (Queensland); Frederick George Kirkegard

Queensland Heritage Register
- Official name: Moorooka State School
- Type: state heritage
- Designated: 28 August 2015
- Reference no.: 602861
- Type: Education, research, scientific facility: School-state
- Theme: Educating Queenslanders: Providing primary schooling

Moorooka State School is a heritage-listed state school at Sherley Street, Moorooka, City of Brisbane, Queensland, Australia. The buildings were designed by Department of Public Works (Queensland) and Frederick George Kirkegard with the first buildings being constructed from 1928 to 1929. It was added to the Queensland Heritage Register on 28 August 2015.

== History ==
Moorooka State School opened in January 1929 to accommodate the growing population of a previously rural district on the southern outskirts of Brisbane. The first Sectional School building was extended in 1933 and 1946 with further Sectional School buildings to its northeast and northwest corners. In 1956 a three-storey brick and concrete classroom block in a modernist style was added, as post-war housing construction in Moorooka continued to increase the local population. The standard and purpose-built school buildings are set amongst terraced, landscaped grounds with mature trees. Apart from a brief hiatus during World War II (WWII), the school has been in continuous operation since establishment and has been a focus for the local community as a place for important social and cultural activity.

Originally part of an area called "Boggo", which ran from Dutton Park to Rocky Water Holes (later Rocklea, c. 1884), and which was part of the traditional lands of the Turrbal people, Moorooka's development was spurred on by transport improvements. Predominantly an agricultural area until the early 20th century, the coming of the Beenleigh railway line in 1885 increased the attraction of the district for residential development. The Moorooka railway station was established in 1887 and the Moorooka Railway Station Estate was advertised in 1889, but flooding in 1893 deterred settlement of the area for some time. By 1900 Moorooka was still primarily rural, with most residents living between Ipswich Road and Beaudesert Road. The house "Greenloaning", built for Robert Bell in 1904, was on land which later became the Moorooka State School's Infant School, and his family lived there until WWII.

Residential development occurred to the west and north of the school site in the early 20th century, assisted by the extension of the tramline to Yeronga Park in 1915. In the 1920s the area east of Ipswich Road, to the south of Yeronga Park, was used for war service housing. The tram line was extended from Yeronga Park, down Beaudesert Road as far as Mayfield Road, in 1937. However, the area around Moorooka State School (east of Beaudesert Road, between Mayfield and Evans Roads) remained largely undeveloped before WWII, apart from some housing between Bracken Street and Sherley Street.

The establishment of schools was considered an essential step in the development of growing communities and integral to their success. Locals often donated land and labour for a school's construction and the school community contributed to maintenance and development. Schools became a community focus, a symbol of progress, and a source of pride, with enduring connections formed with past pupils, parents, and teachers.

In 1911, the population of Moorooka was 350, rising to 791 by 1921. Pressure for a state school at Moorooka occurred from around 1912, when the Moorooka Progress Association presented a petition to the Education Department. Moorooka children either attended Rocklea State School, or Yeronga State School (established 1867 as Boggo State School). A site for a new school at Moorooka, consisting of 3 acres (1.2 ha) 1 rood 2 perches (1,100 m^{2}), was purchased from Charles Robert Parish by the Department of Public Instruction in December 1927.

The first building constructed for the school, during 1928, was a standard Public Works design. To help ensure consistency and economy, the Queensland Government developed standard plans for its school buildings. From the 1860s until the 1960s, Queensland school buildings were predominantly timber-framed, an easy and cost-effective approach that also enabled the government to provide facilities in remote areas. Standard designs were continually refined in response to changing needs and educational philosophy and Queensland school buildings were particularly innovative in climate control, lighting, and ventilation. Standardisation produced distinctly similar schools across Queensland with complexes of typical components.

Attention to improving light and ventilation to achieve an optimum classroom environment culminated in 1920 with the Sectional School (Type DT/1), a high-set timber structure. This fundamentally new design combined all the best features of previous types and implemented theories of an ideal education environment. It proved very successful and was used unaltered until 1950. This type was practical, economical, satisfied educational requirements and climatic needs and allowed for the orderly expansion of schools over time.

Before the Sectional School, all school buildings were generally aligned with street and property boundaries, regardless of aspect. By late 1914, after acceptance of the principles and virtues of providing natural light into classrooms advocated by Eleanor Bourne, (appointed as the first Medical Inspector of Schools in 1911), buildings were being preferably orientated to receive maximum indirect southern light. The Sectional School type was designed to have an unobstructed wall of windows on its southern elevation and verandahs, typically to the north but sometimes to the end elevations, allowing for linkages to other and future buildings. Its blank end walls were also detailed to be removable, so that as the school grew, the building could be easily extended in sections, hence the name. This led to the construction of long narrow buildings of many classrooms - a distinctive feature of Queensland schools.

The Sectional School building at Moorooka was aligned approximately east–west, being lowset at the east end, and highset at the west end (due to sloping ground), and consisted of five classrooms 21 by 18 feet (6.4 by 5.5 m), with an 8-foot (2.4 m) northern verandah which wrapped around the east and west sides. A teachers room projected off the northern verandah, and the northeast and northwest verandah corners were enclosed. The 1928 plan indicated possible future expansion through the addition of buildings off each corner of the first building, linked by their verandahs; an expansion approach that accommodated the sloping site. The building (known as Block B in 2015) had a Dutch-gabled roof and was set on concrete piers. About two thirds of the understorey play area, on the west side, was floored with concrete. Three of the classrooms were linked by folding partitions, which could be opened to create an assembly hall. The remaining partitions were fixed, with centred doorways. It was reported that there was room for 200 pupils, with ample light and ventilation provided by large windows on the southern side. The completed cost was £2,607.

Moorooka State School opened in January 1929 with 139 children and 6 teachers. By the end of the year, enrolments had increased to 230. At the school's official opening on 16 March 1929, Thomas Wilson, the Minister for Public Instruction, noted that the school, built on the elevated part of the site, had a beautiful view to the west, and was positioned to allow for future expansion.

Efforts were made to improve the school grounds and its facilities. The Ladies Committee worked to provide a piano, a sewing machine and a library, and to install electric lights at the school. In late 1929 a concert was held in the Ideal Picture Theatre in Yeronga to raise funds. The uneven parade ground between the school and Sherley Street was levelled by government relief workers, and boys at the school helped remove tree stumps from the grounds. In 1931 two tennis courts were opened, southwest of the school building, with money raised by the School Committee, the Ladies Committee, and teachers.

The continued increase in daily attendance (averaging 260 by 1933) also led to a new two-classroom wing for 100 children (known as Block A in 2015) officially opened on 27 May 1933 by Frank Cooper, the Minister for Public Instruction. Connected to the northeast corner of the 1929 block, the addition was another Sectional School building, with the same proportions and features as the first. The south wall had casement windows with fanlights, while the northern windows were double-hung sashes. There was a teachers room off the north verandah, and semi-enclosed hat rooms at the northwest and southeast verandah corners. Inside, the building had coved ceilings, with exposed metal tie rods.

WWII affected the functioning of Moorooka State School. In 1942, a Staging Camp (Camp Moorooka) was constructed for the US Army between Mayfield Road and Bracken Street, extending south to the east of Medina Street, and west to the southeast corner of Moorooka State School. Due to the fear of a Japanese invasion of Australia, the Queensland Government closed all coastal state schools in late January 1942, but while most state schools resumed on 2 March 1942, some, such as Moorooka, remained closed for "special reasons". The US Army took over Moorooka State School from 24 February 1942, and as a result, most of Moorooka's pupils went to Junction Park State School. However, Moorooka's students were allowed back to their own school on 13 July 1942.

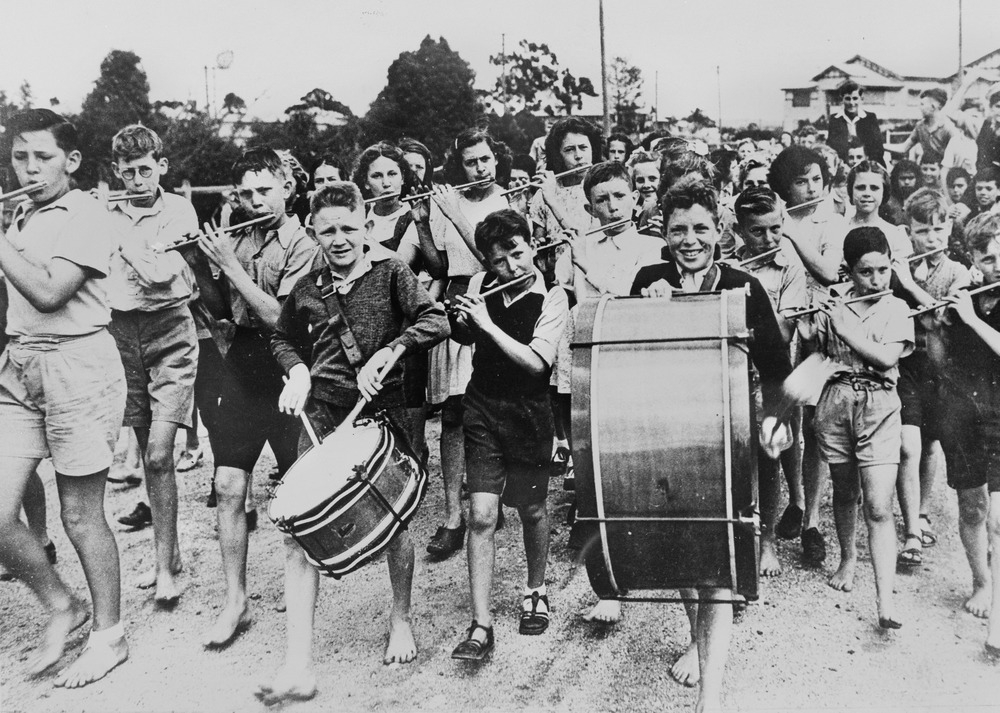
Moorooka State School Band welcoming home soldiers from World War II, circa 1945

Substantial housing development also occurred south of the school towards the end of WWII. In 1944–45 the Moorooka War Workers Housing Estate was built between Scherger Street and Evans Road, for married workers at the Rocklea Munitions Works. This complemented the hostels built for single workers, located to the west of Beaudesert Road, south of Hamilton Road, and the hostels' area was later used for housing ex-servicemen. After the war, the business centre of Moorooka shifted to Moorvale, at the junction of Beaudesert and Mayfield Roads.

Moorooka State School continued to expand after WWII, as a result of housing development and an increased local population. In 1947 the combined population of Moorooka, Rocklea and Salisbury was 8,364, and this rose to 12,163 in 1954, and 17,246 by 1971. In late 1946 a new wing for infants (known as Block C in 2015) was added to the northwest corner of the original building. Another Sectional School design, this was highset (although lower than the 1929 building) with the understorey floor concreted. Plans also show a concrete retaining wall between the 1946 building and Sherley Street. The roof was Dutch-gabled, and the northern verandah wrapped around the east and west sides. The southern side was lit by casement windows and the northern by double-hung sash windows. The two classrooms were larger than in the previous blocks, being 26 by 23 feet (7.9 by 7.0 m) and divided by a folding partition. Ceilings were coved, with exposed metal tie-rods and latticed vents. Hat rooms were located at the south end of the west verandah, and the northeast corner of the verandah of the new building; while the connection to the 1929 building, by steps rising up between the verandahs, required the relocation of an existing hatroom to the south end of the latter's western verandah. It is claimed that the windows on the verandah side of Block C improved ventilation, and that these rooms were popular.

The Department of Public Instruction was largely unprepared for the enormous demand for state education that began in the late 1940s and continued well into the 1960s. This was a nation-wide occurrence resulting from the unprecedented population growth now termed the "baby boom". Queensland schools were overcrowded and, to cope, many new buildings were constructed and existing buildings were extended. At Moorooka State School, a former Camp Moorooka store building to the south of the school was converted into four classrooms in 1946. Between 1946 and 1950 a new teachers room was attached to the east verandah of the 1929 block, as well as a single-storey extension to the west of the existing northern teachers room. Concrete stairs to the northwest of Block A, similar to those adjacent to Block C, were also added around that time. Two temporary classrooms blocks (totalling five classrooms), were built between 1948 and 1951, on 0.7 hectares (1.7 acres) of land added to the south side of Moorooka State School in 1943. Such temporary buildings were constructed in Queensland schools between 1943 and 1951, and were introduced as an expedient, temporary solution to the baby boom and post-war shortages of labour and materials. The remainder of the school grounds, to the south, were added by 1950.

While the majority of school buildings were built to standard plans, as in other periods, some buildings were also constructed to a purposed design. These were typically constructed in areas of stable, suburban and urban populations and can be seen as an evolution of the urban brick school buildings of the early 1900s and depression-era brick school buildings. They were generally substantial structures of brick and concrete that introduced many innovative ideas that later found their way into standard plans. For example, brick was progressively used more frequently in high schools as standard.

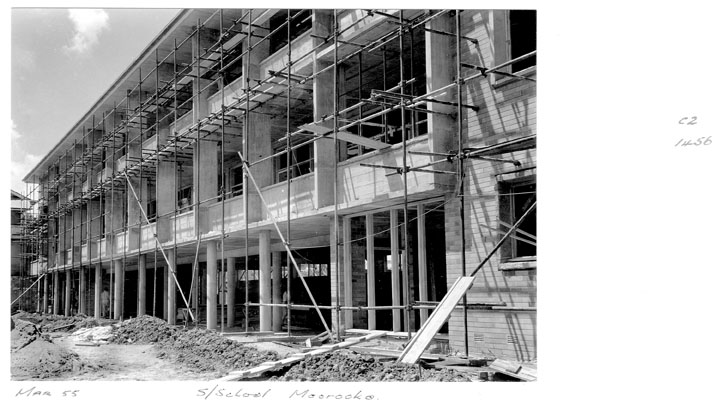
Block D under construction, March 1955

In 1953, new brick primary school buildings were planned for Moorooka, Townsville and Walkervale (Bundaberg), as part of a school-building program at that time that was reportedly a record for the state. Moorooka State School's new brick and concrete three-storey classroom block (known as Block D in 2015) was approved in 1953, at a cost of £43,635, and the building was opened in 1956. The building was designed by Frederick George Kirkegard, a student architect with the Department of Public Works, in a modernist, austere style popular at the time.

Modernist architecture developed in pre-World War I Europe and gained popularity in Australia after WWII. It is notable for a rationalisation of planning, emphasising clarity and simplicity of form and detailing. Distinguished by their extensive use of steel, reinforced concrete and glass, Australian buildings in the modern or International style were heavily influenced by American and European examples. Characteristics included rectangular massing, plain smooth walls with areas of contrasting textures, and selective expression of structural systems, such as concrete framework. In Queensland, architects sought to create climatically responsive modernist buildings by combining careful building orientation, sun-shading devices and natural ventilation methods. This design approach was consistent with the requirements espoused by United Kingdom and New South Wales educationalists at the time, who advocated for schools that were climatically responsive with diffused natural light, and constructed of modern materials that were durable, washable and attractive. Education in the 1950s was embracing the modern, and media reports at the time espoused the virtues of bright and attractive school buildings for encouraging student attendance, stating that "Brisbane's modern new State schools should make for happier, healthier learning".

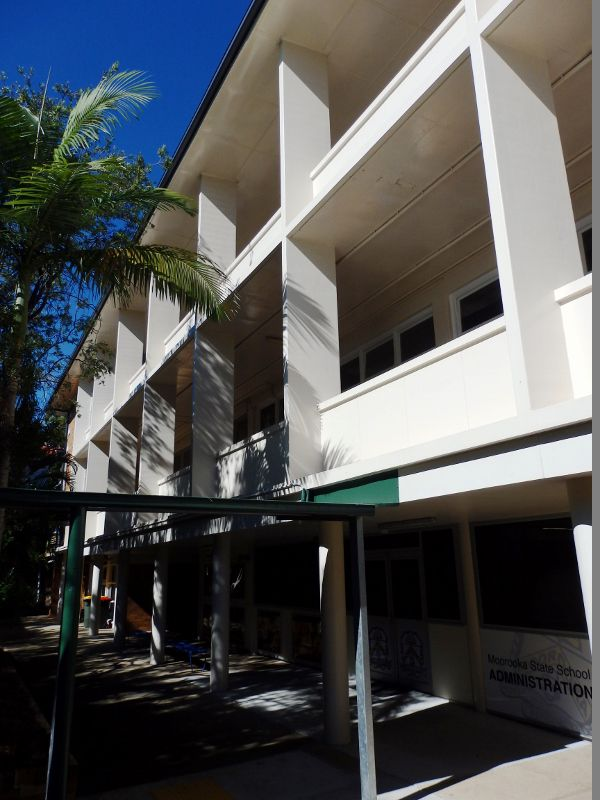
Block D: north elevation with verandahs and concrete fins, 2015

The new building at Moorooka was anticipated to "provide classrooms and other facilities of the most modern character". Kirkegard's design comprised an elongated form of rectangular massing, with contrasting areas of facebrick (enclosing the east and west ends) and painted concrete (verandah and shade elements). There were open verandahs on the northern side, with large concrete fins that contributed to sun control, and a concrete balustrade. The building had timber-framed hopper windows on the southern elevation with a long flat concrete hood, and double-hung sash windows with fanlights on the northern elevation. Constructed to the southwest of Block C, the new building contained an open play area for most of the ground floor, with a health services room, glazed entry lobby and stairwell at the east end, and a stairwell and boys lavatory at the west end. The first floor included four classrooms, a store and cloakroom at the west end, and a head teachers room, with associated lobby and bathroom, at the east end; while the second floor had four classrooms, with a store and cloak room at the west end and a utility room at the east end. A curved Brisbane tuff (commonly but incorrectly known as porphyry) retaining wall with incorporated planter boxes, was also built to the north and east of Block D at this time (with concrete block extension in the late 1960s).

The school continued to expand from the 1950s onwards, with new buildings and some changes to existing buildings. New tennis courts were built by 1955, further south on the east side of the school, after Block D was built north of the original tennis courts. In 1958 Blocks J and K were built for an Infant's School (opened 1959). In 1959 Block C's western verandah was enclosed as a store and hat room, new stairs were built at each end of Block B (on the verandahs, leading down to the understorey), and a boys' toilet was added inside the Head Teacher's room in Block D.

The 1960s was a period of growth at the school. Enrolments rose from 700 to 1000 between 1967 and 1970, although later fell back to 700 by 1976. Further buildings were added to the school during the 1960s and 1970s, along with a swimming pool in 1963. An east-west retaining wall was built south of Block A in the late 1960s, and the retaining wall to the northwest of Block A was extended to Sherley Street at the same time. Staff toilets were added to the west end of the ground floor of Block D c. 1968, and a library (Block L) was built south of the east end of Block D in 1977. Meanwhile, the converted army hut was removed from the grounds c. 1958, and the temporary classrooms blocks between 1972 and 1974.

The population of Moorooka in 1976 was 9,639, but the late 1970s saw a decline in student numbers, due to an aging population. In 1983, the Junior and Primary Schools were combined. In December 2006, Blocks J and K were destroyed by an arson attack, but were replaced with a multi-purpose hall that opened in 2009. Moorooka's population was 8,609 in 2001, rising to 9,984 in 2011. The arrival in the suburb of immigrant families from culturally diverse backgrounds is reflected in the current student body at Moorooka State School.

The school grounds now cover 5.1 hectares (13 acres), and include mature plantings, some of which were planted by students on Arbor Days. The provision of outdoor play space was a result of the early and continuing commitment by the Department of Public Instruction to play-based education, particularly in primary school. Trees and gardens were planted as part of beautification of schools. In the 1870s, schools inspector William Alexander Boyd was critical of tropical schools and among his recommendations stressed the importance of adding shade trees to playgrounds. In addition, Arbor Day celebrations began in Queensland in 1890. Landscape elements were often constructed to standard designs and were intrinsic to Queensland Government education philosophies. Educators believed gardening and Arbor Days instilled in young minds the value of hard work and activity, improved classroom discipline and developed aesthetic tastes. Aesthetically designed gardens were encouraged by regional inspectors. Mature trees currently along the northwest boundary were evident in aerial photographs from 1946. Memorials commemorating Anzac Day (2008) and the opening of the Outdoor Learning Centre (2004) have been placed adjacent to one of two pencil pines (Cupressus sempervirens) to the northeast of Block C.

In 2015, the school continues to operate from its original site. It retains standard timber and purpose-built brick buildings dating from 1929 to the 1950s, set in landscaped grounds. The school is important as a focus for the surrounding community and generations of students from the area have been taught there. Since establishment the school has been a key social focus for the local community. The grounds and buildings have been the location of many social and community events over time, including as a meeting place of the Moorooka Branch of the Australian Red Cross during WWII, and for fetes to raise funds for the school.

== Description ==
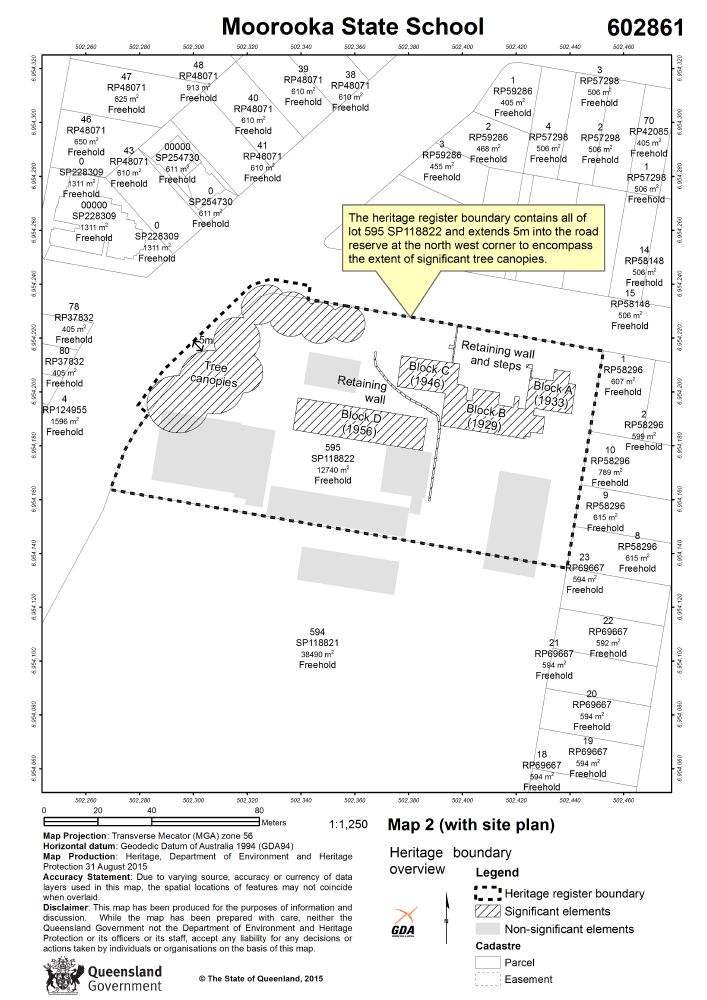
Site plan of the school, 2015

Moorooka State School occupies a 5.1-hectare (13-acre) site (Lots 595 SP118822 and 594 SP118821) bounded by Sherley Street to the north, Beaudesert Road to the west, Alexander Park to the south, and residential properties that front Blomfield Street to the east. However, the registered boundary encompasses the northern 1.3 hectares (3.2 acres) of the school (Lot 595 SP118822 only), consistent with the 1927 school reserve. The main entrance to the school is along Sherley Street, where the timber school buildings (Blocks A, B and C) and mature trees along the boundary contribute to the suburban streetscape. The site slopes downwards from northeast to southwest. The school complex comprises a variety of educational buildings and landscape features of varying eras of design and construction. Of these, significant components are concentrated to the north and include:

- Block B – Sectional School Building (1929)
- Block A – Sectional School Building (1933);
- Block C – Sectional School Building (1946)
- Block D – Brick and Concrete Building (1956)
- Landscape features – Mature trees and retaining walls

Elements within the registered boundary that are not considered to be of cultural significance include: Blocks E, F, and I; the Library; various modern ancillary structures; modern landscape features such as pathways and paved areas; and the swimming pool. Where the register boundary extends into road reserve, the road and footpath fabric is not considered to be of cultural significance.

=== Sectional School buildings – Blocks A, B and C ===
The three Sectional School buildings are timber-framed and weatherboard-clad structures on concrete piers, with corrugated metal-clad Dutch-gable roofs and verandahs along the north, east and west sides. The buildings are symmetrically arranged in a U-shaped plan, with Block A and Block C connected to either end of the northern verandah of Block B. The buildings range from lowset to highset, reflecting the slope of the site. From east to west: Block A is lowset; Block B is highset; and Block C is highset, though set lower than Block B and connected via verandah stairs.

The buildings retain extensive early timber joinery. Southern windows comprise large banks of casements with horizontal centre-pivot fanlights. Windows to the northern verandah walls vary, with banks of high-level horizontal centre-pivot windows to Block B, and double-hung sash windows with horizontal centre-pivot fanlights to Blocks A and C. Windows and doors retain early fittings and hardware. The interior walls and ceilings are lined with timber v-jointed (VJ) tongue-and-groove (T&G) boards. The ceilings are coved, with exposed metal tie rods and square lattice ceiling vents. Skirtings and architraves are timber of a simple profile.

Verandah walls are single-skin, lined with VJ, T&G boards with exposed external framing. Verandah floors are timber, and ceilings are raked and lined with VJ, T&G boards. Joinery to the verandahs includes square timber posts and two-rail timber balustrades with battened balusters. Classrooms are accessed from the northern verandahs via flush-panelled doors with fanlights. Hat / bag hooks are attached to the verandah walls of Blocks B and C.

Teachers rooms are attached to the north and east sides of Block B, and to the north of Block A; they are gable-roofed and weatherboard-clad, and feature skillion window hoods with timber brackets. The north-facing teachers rooms have battened gable infills. The interior walls and flat ceilings are lined with VJ, T&G boards.

Elements of the Sectional School buildings not considered to be of cultural significance include additions and alterations such as: modern extensions; carpet and linoleum floor linings; sheeted and glazed partitions; ceiling fans and air conditioning units; understorey enclosures; modern joinery, fixtures and fittings; and aluminium framed windows.

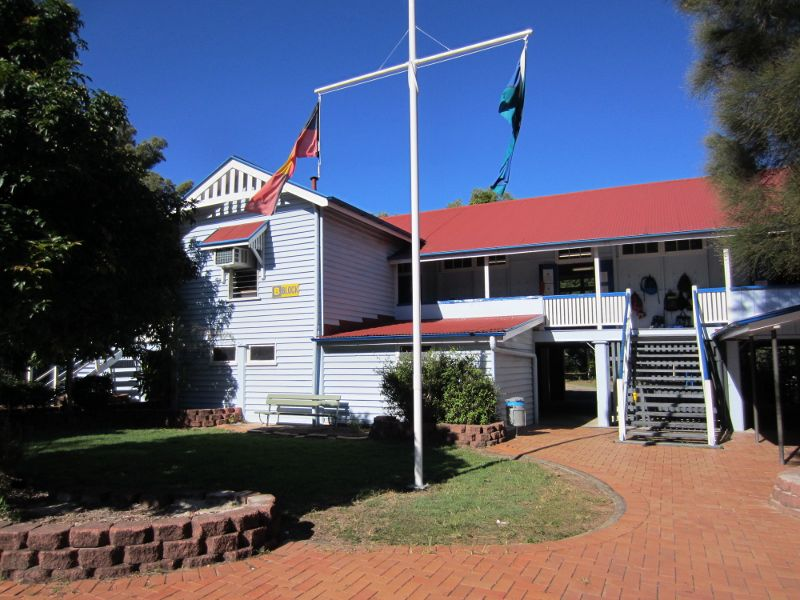
Block B with projecting teachers' room, 2015

=== Block B (1929) – Centre ===
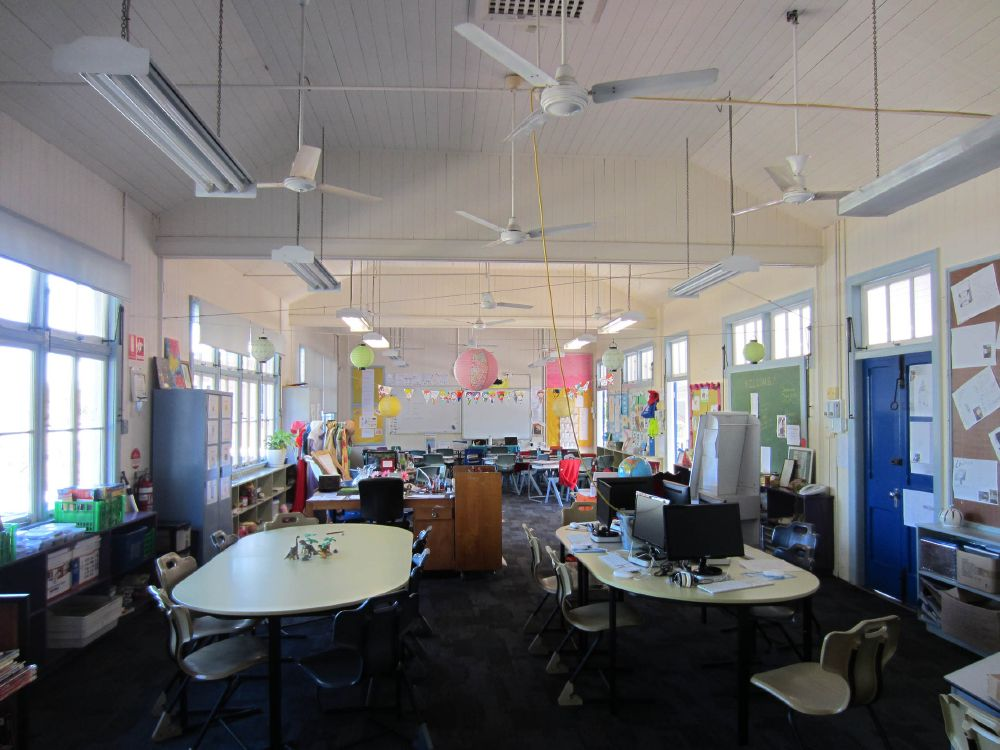
Classroom interior of Block B, 2015

Block B contains an open plan classroom space (formerly five classrooms). The lintels and bulkheads of the four original classroom partitions remain, with a modern concertina door inserted into one opening.

An early hat room enclosure (1946) is retained on the southwestern corner of the verandah, along with a connecting stair to the northwest. The northern verandah is accessed via two sets of external stairs. Additional stairs (c. 1959) have been inserted into the east and west verandahs, providing covered access to the understorey. The east verandah stairs are enclosed with a combination of modern fixed glazing and louvres.

The eastern teachers room (c. 1946 - 1950) is lowset on timber stumps; and connected to the 1929 building via a small verandah extension. The door is panelled and the windows to the north, east and south are narrow, double-row casements.

The northern teachers room is highset on concrete piers. floor. The window on the eastern wall is an original casement, while the fixed northern window and verandah door are modern. There is a lowset weatherboard-clad extension to the west (added c. 1946-50).

The understorey of Block B combines open areas for play, and enclosed areas for storage and a workshop (former modern tuckshop). The southern side has been partly enclosed with facebrick, which also formed the tuckshop counter area. Other areas are enclosed by either concrete, corrugated metal or timber battens. The understorey of the northern teachers room is enclosed with weatherboard cladding.

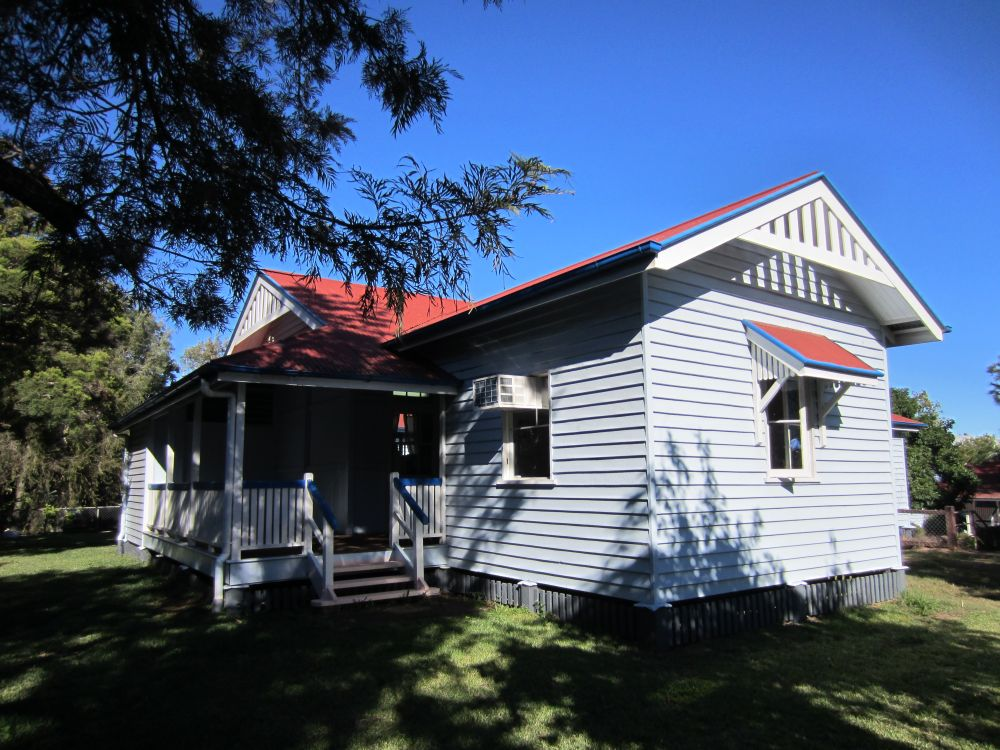
Block A, 2015

=== Block A (1933) – East ===
Block A contains two classrooms, separated by an original partition with part-glazed double-doors. Part-height modern partitions form a small office space within the western classroom. The east and west facing Dutch-gable ends feature battened infills. The lowset understorey is also enclosed by timber battens.

The verandahs are partially enclosed with modern sheeted and glazed partitions on the northern side between the teachers room and classrooms, and in the southeast corner for a store room (former hat room). The original semi-enclosed hat room is retained in the northwest corner.

Two sets of timber stairs access the northern verandah either side of the lowset teachers room. The teachers room retains a casement window to the north, while the eastern window has been replaced.

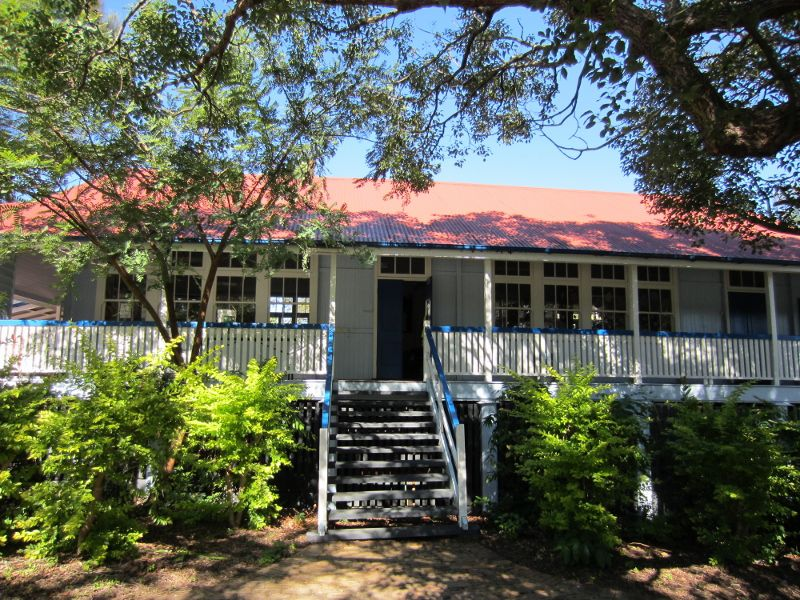
Block C, 2015

=== Block C (1946) – West ===
Block C is primarily highset, with a lowset eastern verandah that is supported by a concrete retaining wall (1946). The building contains an open plan classroom space (formerly two classrooms - larger than those in Block A). The former layout is discernable from partition bulkheads that remain.

The original semi-enclosed hat rooms are retained in the northwest and northeast corners of the verandah. The western verandah (now enclosed) is clad externally with weatherboard and lined internally with flat sheeting, and has with timber-framed hopper windows. Timber stairs provide external access to the north and east verandahs. The understorey is enclosed with corrugated metal, timber battens and concrete panels, and used as a storage area.

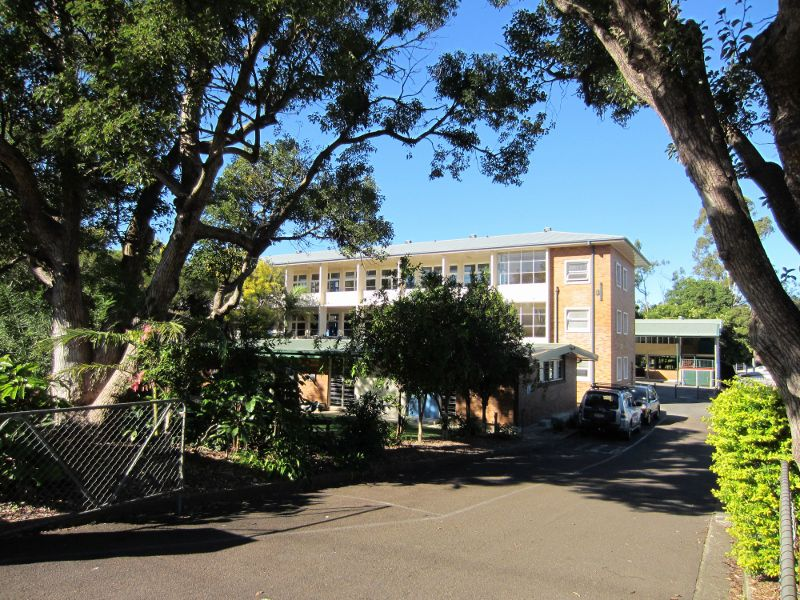
Block D as seen from Sherley Street entrance, 2015

=== Brick and Concrete Building – Block D (1956) ===
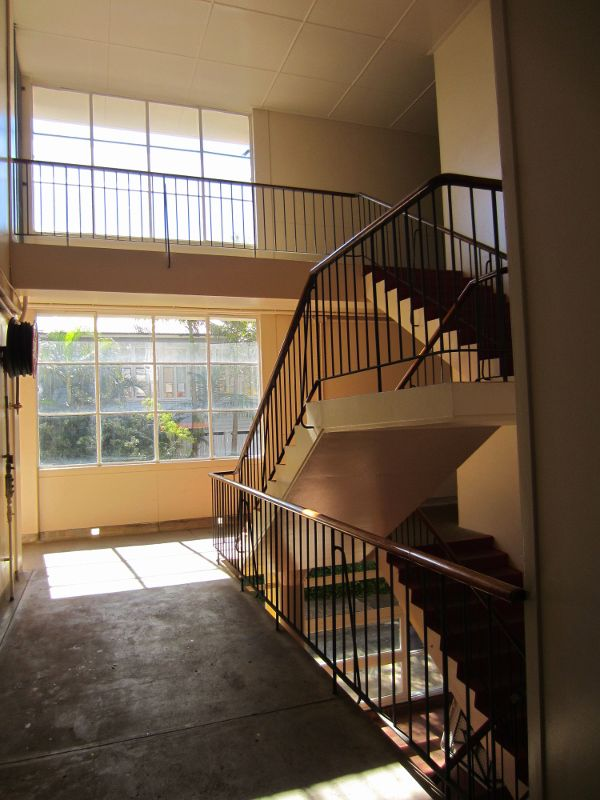
Block D; east stairwell from first floor landing, with glazed verandah bays, 2015

Block D is a three-storey, brick and reinforced-concrete building with a low-profile hipped roof. The building has rectangular massing and the elongated form comprises three distinct sections: full height facebrick enclosing concrete stairwells and amenities at the east and west ends; and first and second floor classrooms with north-facing verandahs to the centre.

The north elevation features vertical and horizontal concrete fins forming ten bays to each of the upper floors. The verandahs are painted concrete and the end bays are enclosed with fixed, metal-framed glazing. The south elevation features a continuous, flat reinforced-concrete hood over the lower windows.

The building retains much of its original timber-framed joinery. Windows to the east-end section are hoppers with rendered projecting jambs, and the west-end section has mostly casement windows. Classrooms have banks of south-facing hopper windows with fixed timber shelves to sill height. Windows to the verandah walls are double-hung sashes with horizontal centre-pivot fanlights. Some verandah windows on the second floor have been replaced with aluminium-framed sliders. Classroom doors are low-waisted timber with glazed inserts. Classrooms at the western end have sliding doors.

There are three (formerly four) classrooms on both the first and second floors. The fixed classroom partitions have timber doors at the southern end. Original folding partitions have been removed; however, the fixed partition bulkheads and doorways remain. Walls and ceilings are lined with flat sheeting.

The west end section has lavatories to ground floor, and open meeting spaces (former cloak rooms) and toilets to the first and second floors. The east end section has a glazed entrance lobby to ground floor, and a combination of offices, storage and toilets to the first and second floors. The stairs in both end sections have metal balustrades with timber handrails. A ramp at the eastern end of the first floor connects with the understorey of Block B to the east.

Much of the ground floor (formerly open play space supported by concrete piers) has been enclosed with fibrous-cement sheeting to form modern office spaces. Open areas have been retained adjacent to the east and west stairwells. These thoroughfares have fixed timber bench seats.

=== Landscape Elements / Grounds ===
The established school grounds comprise mature trees and garden beds, as well as various built landscape features.

The sloping site is terraced with embankments and retaining structures. The school is set slightly below Sherley Street, with earth embankments along part of the northern boundary. There is a flat parade ground to the north of Block B, surrounded by garden beds. A concrete retaining wall (1946) with stairs aligns to the north of Block C, and a similar set of concrete stairs (pre-1950) are located north of Block A. A curved retaining wall (c. 1955), finished with Brisbane Tuff, extends from northwest of Block C around to southeast of Block D. The wall is stepped and incorporates planter boxes.

Mature trees including figs (Ficus spp.) and camphor laurels (Cinnamomum camphora) are concentrated along the northwest boundary of the school and contribute to the streetscape. Further mature plantings of various Eucalypt species (Eucalyptus spp.) are concentrated near the eastern boundary of the school. Two mature pencil pines (Cupressus Sempervirens) are located adjacent to the entrance on Sherley Street.

Memorial plaques have been placed adjacent to one of the pencil pines. One memorial is an ANZAC Day commemoration from 2008, the other is in commemoration of the opening of the Outdoor Learning Centre in 2004.

== Heritage listing ==
Moorooka State School was listed on the Queensland Heritage Register on 28 August 2015 having satisfied the following criteria.

The place is important in demonstrating the evolution or pattern of Queensland's history.

Moorooka State School (established in 1929) is important in demonstrating the evolution of state education and its associated architecture in Queensland. The place retains excellent, representative examples of a standard government design that was an architectural response to prevailing government educational philosophies, and a non-standard design that reflects the specific needs of the school.

Three connected Sectional School buildings (1929, 1933 and 1946) demonstrate the culmination of many years of experimental timber school design by the Department of Public Works (DPW), providing equally for educational and climatic needs.

A three-storey brick and concrete building (1956) demonstrates the post-war construction of larger and more permanent school buildings in areas of established populations. The building reflects mid-20th century architectural and educationalist movements through its modernist, climatically responsive design and materials.

The grounds retain mature trees and landscaping features, representative of suburban school sites, and demonstrate the importance of play and aesthetics in the education of children.

The place is important in demonstrating the principal characteristics of a particular class of cultural places.

Moorooka State School is important in demonstrating the principal characteristics of a Queensland state school with later modifications. The school is a good, intact example of a suburban school complex, comprising: timber-framed teaching buildings constructed to standard designs by the Queensland Government; a non-standard brick and concrete building; and a landscaped site with mature shade trees, retaining walls and assembly / play areas.

The three connected Sectional School buildings (1929, 1933 and 1946) are fine, intact examples of their type, comprising: timber-framed structure; Dutch-gabled roofs; highset form with play space beneath (1929 and 1946 buildings); blank end walls; northern verandahs, with linkages between buildings; large banks of south-facing windows; projecting teachers rooms (1929 and 1933 buildings); hat room enclosures; single-skin verandah walls; coved ceilings with metal tie- rods and latticed vents; and early joinery and internal linings.

The brick and concrete building (1956) is an excellent, intact example of an individually-designed state school building, typically constructed in areas with large urban populations to meet the specific needs of the school. Designed in a mid-20th century modernist style, the building combines rectangular massing, walls with areas of contrasting textures and climatically responsive design elements such as concrete fin sun-shades. The efficiently planned and well composed building comprises an elongated form, with facebrick and metal-framed glazing enclosing stairwells at the east and west ends, north-facing concrete verandahs along the first and second floors, and a glazed entrance and lobby to the east.

The place has a strong or special association with a particular community or cultural group for social, cultural or spiritual reasons.

Schools have always played an important part in Queensland communities. They typically retain significant and enduring connections with former pupils, parents, and teachers; provide a venue for social interaction and volunteer work; and are a source of pride, symbolising local progress and aspirations.

Moorooka State School has a strong and ongoing association with the surrounding community. It was established in 1929 through the efforts of the local community and generations of children have been taught there. The place is important for its contribution to the educational development of its suburban district and is a prominent community focal point and gathering place for social and commemorative events with widespread community support.
