= Queensland Sport and Athletics Centre =

Multi-purpose sports facility in Brisbane, Queensland

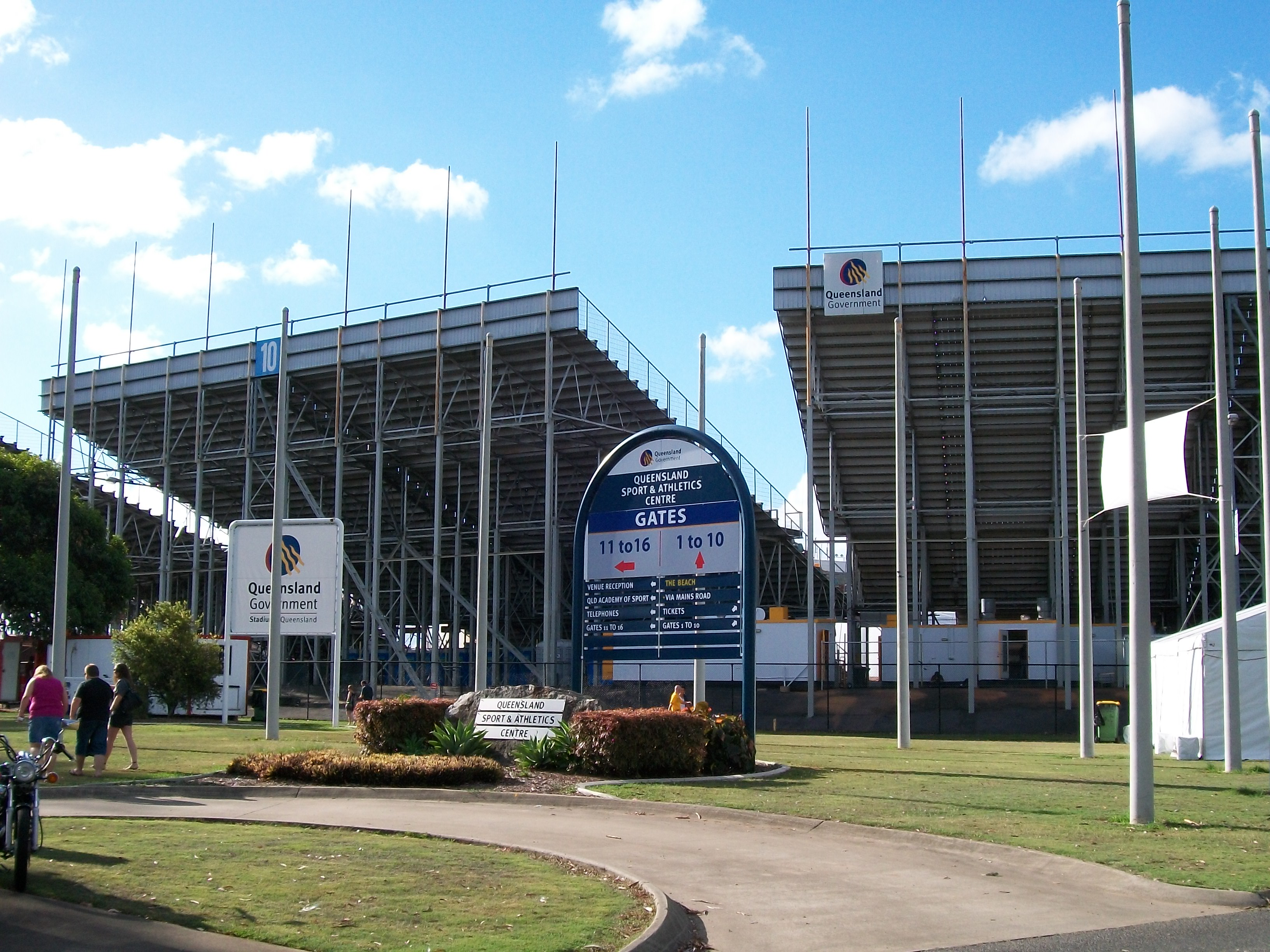
- Exterior of the main stadium from Kessels Road, photographed in November 2009
- Interactive map of Queensland Sport and Athletics Centre
- Former names: Queen Elizabeth II Jubilee Sports Centre (1977–1993); ANZ Stadium (1993–2003)
- Location: Kessels Road; Nathan, Queensland
- Coordinates: 27°33′30″S 153°3′44″E
- Owner: Queensland Government
- Operator: Stadiums Queensland
- Capacity: 48,500 (main stadium); 2,100 (State Athletics Facility)
- Record attendance: 58,912 (1997 Super League Grand Final)

Construction
- Opened: 1975

Tenants
- Brisbane Broncos (1993–2003); Queensland (State of Origin) (2001–2002); (1997 Super League Grand Final)

The Queensland Sport and Athletics Centre (QSAC /ˈkjuːzæk/ KEW-zak, formerly known as the Queen Elizabeth II Jubilee Sports Centre) is a multi-purpose sports facility in Nathan, Brisbane, Queensland, located 10 kilometres (6.2 miles) south-east of the Brisbane CBD.

Its main stadium – formerly known as QEII Stadium, and later ANZ Stadium under a naming rights agreement with ANZ – accommodates 48,500 spectators, while its smaller State Athletics Facility accommodates 2,100 spectators. Both stadiums feature Rekortan running tracks and natural grass fields.

The Queensland Academy of Sport, Queensland State Netball Centre (named as Nissan Arena), and a complex of beach volleyball courts are also housed at the facility. QSAC is owned by the Queensland Government, and its main stadium and State Athletics Facility are operated through its agency, Stadiums Queensland.

== History ==
The land was originally part of the holdings of pioneer South Brisbane land baron James Toohey, until resumed by the government in 1913, for use as a cemetery reserve.

=== 1970s ===
The facility opened in 1975, providing a synthetic running track for athletics competitions that was unaffected by wet weather, the first in Queensland. It was officially named Queen Elizabeth II Jubilee Sports Centre by the Queen in 1977 to mark her Silver Jubilee. It was constructed in close proximity to both the Queen Elizabeth II Jubilee Hospital and Griffith University campus, which provided athlete accommodation.

Originally, the section of the stadium covered by roofing was intended to be the only permanent seating facility. The remainder of the stadium seating was built as "temporary" seating and was intended to be removed after the 1982 Commonwealth Games had finished. Public opinion resulted in the unroofed temporary seating being retained as permanent.

The stadium was named ANZ Stadium from 1993 to 2003 when it was the home of the Brisbane Broncos rugby league football team (when the club left Lang Park and subsequently returned following its redevelopment). The stadium currently has a capacity of 48,500 people, although the record crowd is 58,912, set during the 1997 Super League Grand Final amid the Super League war which saw the Broncos defeat the Cronulla-Sutherland Sharks 26–8. The capacity can be increased to 60,000 with the use of extra temporary seating in front of the Eastern and Western grandstands. These were removed when the running track was relaid for the 2001 Goodwill Games.

In 1999, ANZ Stadium hosted eventual champions Australia in their Davis Cup Semi-Final win over Russia 4–1. Temporary grass courts were erected up one end of the field and temporary stands on 3 sides. The crowd capacity for this event was 10, 600. 1999 Australian Open Champion and Russian Davis Cup player Yevgeny Kafelnikov described the court "like playing on a potato field" and "that court is just not acceptable for this kind of event".

=== 2000s ===
In 2002, ownership transferred to the Queensland Government Major Sports Facilities Authority and the venue was given its present name.

While the athletics facilities are well utilised, the stands at the stadium have largely stood empty and unused since the Broncos returned to a redeveloped Lang Park in 2003.

In 2017, a dedicated Queensland State Netball Centre was built on one corner of the property.

=== 2020s ===
In April 2023, a Right to Information application by Brisbane Times revealed plans for QSAC to be modified to become a temporary home for the Brisbane Lions AFL club while their home stadium, The Gabba, is demolished and rebuilt for the 2032 Summer Olympics.

As a possible host to competitions for the 2032 Summer Olympics and 2032 Summer Paralympics, concern on koala habitat destruction was raised especially as the area was part of the greater Toohey Forest.

The stadium is still actively used by athletes at local, state and national levels. Many local clubs such as Thompson Estate and Eastern Suburbs Athletics use it regularly for training.

== Stadium events ==
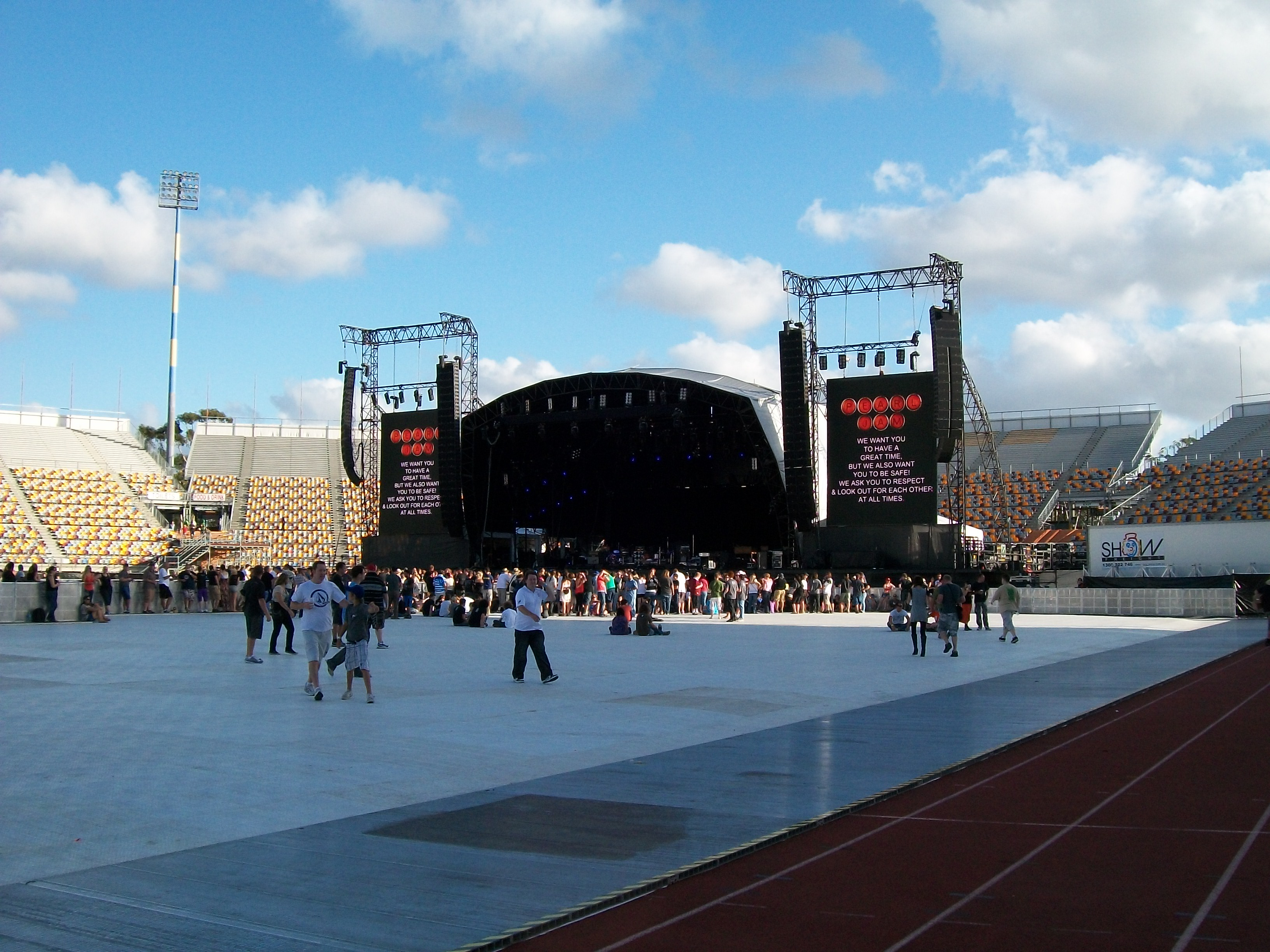
Crowd gathering for the Pearl Jam show being played at the QSAC on 25 November 2009

The stadium has hosted a number of events, including:

- 11 editions of the Australian Championships in Athletics, the most of any existing venue
- 1982 – 1982 Commonwealth Games
- 1985 – Bruce Springsteen & The E Street Band – 31 March 1985
- 1986 – Dire Straits, Brothers-in-Arms tour – 27 March 1986
- 1986 – World Junior Squash Championships
- 1986 – Pope John Paul II, Mass – 25 November 1986
- 1993 – U2 with Big Audio Dynamite II and Kim Salmon and the Surrealists – 20 November 1993
- 1993 – Madonna – 24 November 1993
- 1994 – 1994 Rugby League World Club Challenge
- 1995 – The Rolling Stones – 12 April 1995
- 1995 – The Eagles – 24 November 1995
- 1996 – Michael Jackson HIStory World Tour, 40,000 people – 19 November 1996
- 1997 – 1997 Super League Grand Final
- 1998 – U2 with Sidewinder – 25 February 1998
- 1999 – 1999 Davis Cup Semi-Final tie vs. Russia
- 2001 – Goodwill Games
- 2001/2002 – State of Origin series games
- 2002 – An assignment on the third season of The Mole, filmed in early 2002, where the contestants had to draw an animal using the painting machines normally used to mark the playing fields.
- 2006 – U2 with Kanye West – 7 November 2006
- 2009 – Pearl Jam with Relentless7 – 25 November 2009
- 2010 – AC/DC with Wolfmother – 25 and 27 February 2010
- 2010–2011 – This venue served as an evacuation centre for residents affected by the 2010–2011 Queensland floods
- 2014 – Matildas vs Brazil – 6 and 9 April 2014
- 2014 – 2014 FFA Cup round of 16 match between Olympic FC and Central Coast Mariners – 16 September 2014
- 2015 – AC/DC with The Hives – 12 and 14 November 2015
- 2017 – Guns N' Roses with Rose Tattoo – 7 February 2017
- 2018 – International friendly football match between South Korea and Uzbekistan – 20 November 2018
- 2019 – Eminem with Hilltop Hoods – 20 February 2019

== Notable rugby league games ==
Date	Result	Attendance	Notes
28 March 1993	Parramatta Eels def. Brisbane Broncos 12–8	51,517	1993 NSWRL season Rd.3; Brisbane Broncos first game at ANZ Stadium. This was the first minor round game to attract over 50,000 fans since Round 4 of 1974.
27 August 1993	St George Dragons def. Brisbane Broncos 16–10	58,593	1993 NSWRL season Rd.22; Brisbane Broncos all-time minor round home attendance record
1 June 1994	Wigan def. Brisbane Broncos 20–14	54,220	1994 World Club Challenge; World Club Challenge attendance record
19 May 1997	New South Wales def. Queensland 23–22 (gp)	35,570	Super League Tri-series Final; Longest professional rugby league game in history (104 minutes)
20 September 1997	Brisbane Broncos def. Cronulla-Sutherland Sharks 26–8	58,912	1997 Super League Grand Final; Brisbane Broncos all-time home attendance record. QSAC all-time attendance record.
1 July 2001	Queensland def. New South Wales 40–14	49,441	2001 State of Origin series Game III; This match was notable as Allan Langer made his Origin comeback, despite playing for Warrington Wolves in the Super League at the time, inspiring the Maroons to a series-deciding victory on home soil.
5 June 2002	Queensland def. New South Wales 26–18	47,989	2002 State of Origin series Game II; This was notably Justin Hodges' debut match for Queensland. Despite two in-goal blunders, the Maroons won the match.
18 May 2003	Brisbane Broncos def. Melbourne Storm 36–16	15,867	2003 NRL season Rd.10; Brisbane Broncos last game at ANZ Stadium

== See also ==
- List of tennis stadiums by capacity
