= James Toohey (prospector) =

19th century Irish-Australian land owner

James Toohey (1827–1883) was a prominent Irish-Australian land owner of the early colony of Brisbane.

== Early life ==
Toohey was born in Galway, Ireland in 1826, the son of Peter and Bridget Toohey (née Dirnan). His father served as an officer in the British Army in North America and after retirement, in 1832 brought his family to New Norfolk, Tasmania near to the penal colony of Hobart. In 1836 his father went to New Zealand in search of work as a cooper. James, his mother and three of his siblings remained in Tasmania until November 1837 when the family moved to Sydney, Australia. Peter supported his family until he drowned in a river in the Bay of Islands area of New Zealand in 1840.

Toohey joined the 1849 Gold Rush of California where he made his fortune as a blacksmith. He returned to Australia in 1853 and settled in Brisbane, Queensland.

He married Anne Dogherty, daughter of John Dogherty and Fanny Cavanagh, on 30 August 1859 at St Stephens Cathedral in Brisbane, Queensland.

== Land speculation ==
Toohey opened a blacksmith's shop in Kangaroo Point and attended the land auctions. After fires destroyed much of early Brisbane city, Toohey was able to add to his property holdings, with acquisitions in South Brisbane, Kangaroo Point, Holland Park, Greenslopes, Tarragindi and Nathan, the current Griffith University Site.

He built a large home in 1874 on land off Logan Road, Greenslopes, named "Mount Galway" and had a track (now Toohey Road) to Toohey Mountain. He leased and then freeholded land under The Settled Land Act in what is now Toohey Forest Park, Mount Gravatt Cemetery and Crematorium, Queensland Sport and Athletics Centre, and Griffith University, and ultimately held possession of the Toohey Forest area.

== Legacy ==
Toohey died on 22 November 1883 and was buried in Dutton Park Cemetery and later moved twice more to Toohey Forest Park and the Mt Gravatt Cemetery.

His will protected land comprising the Toohey Forest area from being sold off after his death within his children's and wife's lifetime. The family's Irish Catholicism made them subject to discrimination. The properties of Toohey were either subdivided/sold by the remaining family members or sold back to the Crown.

Toohey Forest Park and the Mount Gravatt Cemetery reflect the family's history within the region. An incorrect account of the history of Peter Toohey (James' father) was detailed in James Toohey: Brisbane Pioneer or First of the White Shoe Brigade, as the author researched a 'Patrick Toohey', not Peter. This led to the family requesting a retraction based on incorrect information that led to an assumption of adultery and a supposed 'discreet ruse' by the family to cover Peter's absence when he had in fact died in 1840 around the Bay of Islands area in New Zealand.

Children of James and Bridget Toohey
Name	Birth	Death
Peter Toohey	31 October 1861	10 May 1921
Bridget Fanny Tigne	30 January 1863	5 September 1937
Mary Ann O'Neill	2 April 1865	12 July 1920
Ellen Toohey	3 April 1867	21 June 1945
Bridget Frances Toohey	16 December 1868	4 March 1937
Margaret Cecelia Toohey	5 February 1873	18 November 1968
Sarah Ann Toohey	10 April 1875	22 January 1959
Mary Agnes Toohey	8 August 1877	17 April 1957
