= Moorooka =

Suburb of Brisbane, Australia

- Suburb
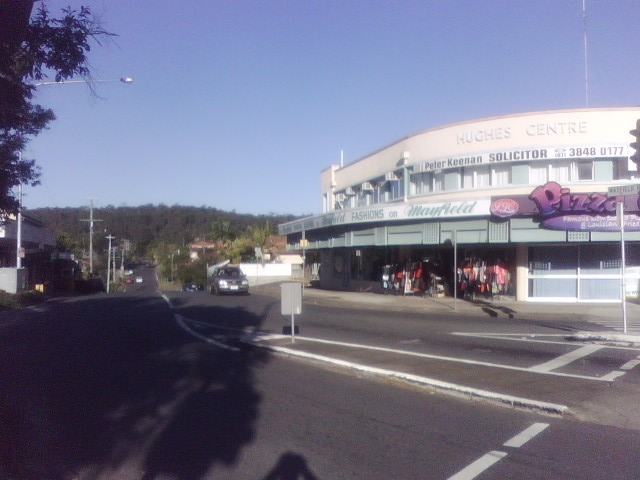
- Hughes Centre and Toohey Forest, from Beaudesert Road

- Interactive map of Moorooka
- Coordinates: 27.5358°S 153.0244°E
- Country: Australia
- State: Queensland
- City: Brisbane
- LGA: City of Brisbane (Moorooka Ward)
- Location: 9.0 km (5.6 mi) S of Brisbane CBD

Government
  - State electorates: Miller; Toohey
  - Federal division: Moreton

Area
  - Total: 4.1 km^{2} (1.6 sq mi)

Population
  - Total: 10,783 (2021 census)
  - Density: 2,630/km^{2} (6,810/sq mi)
- Time zone: UTC+10:00 (AEST)
- Postcode: 4105
Suburbs around Moorooka
Yeerongpilly	Annerley	Tarragindi
Yeerongpilly	Moorooka	Tarragindi
Rocklea	Rocklea	Salisbury

Moorooka (/məˈruːkʌ/ mə-ROO-kuh) is a southern suburb in the City of Brisbane, Queensland, Australia. In the 2021 census, Moorooka had a population of 10,783 people.

== Geography ==
Moorooka is 9.0 kilometres (5.6 mi) by road south of Brisbane's central business district.

Ipswich Road enters the suburb from the north (Annerley) and exits to the south-west (Rocklea). Beaudesert Road splits from Ipswich Road within the suburb and exits to the south (Rocklea).

The Gold Coast railway line passes along part of the western boundary of the suburb, which is serviced by the Moorooka railway station (27.5356°S 153.0139°E).

The neighbourhood of Moorvale is located around the intersection of Beaudesert Road and Mayfield Road (27.5328°S 153.0248°E.

The suburb has mixed uses – large areas, particularly in the elevated eastern side of the suburb are residential. The lower, western side of the suburb is dominated by retail, particularly motor vehicle dealerships along Ipswich Road, known popularly throughout Brisbane as the "Magic Mile of Motors".

== History ==
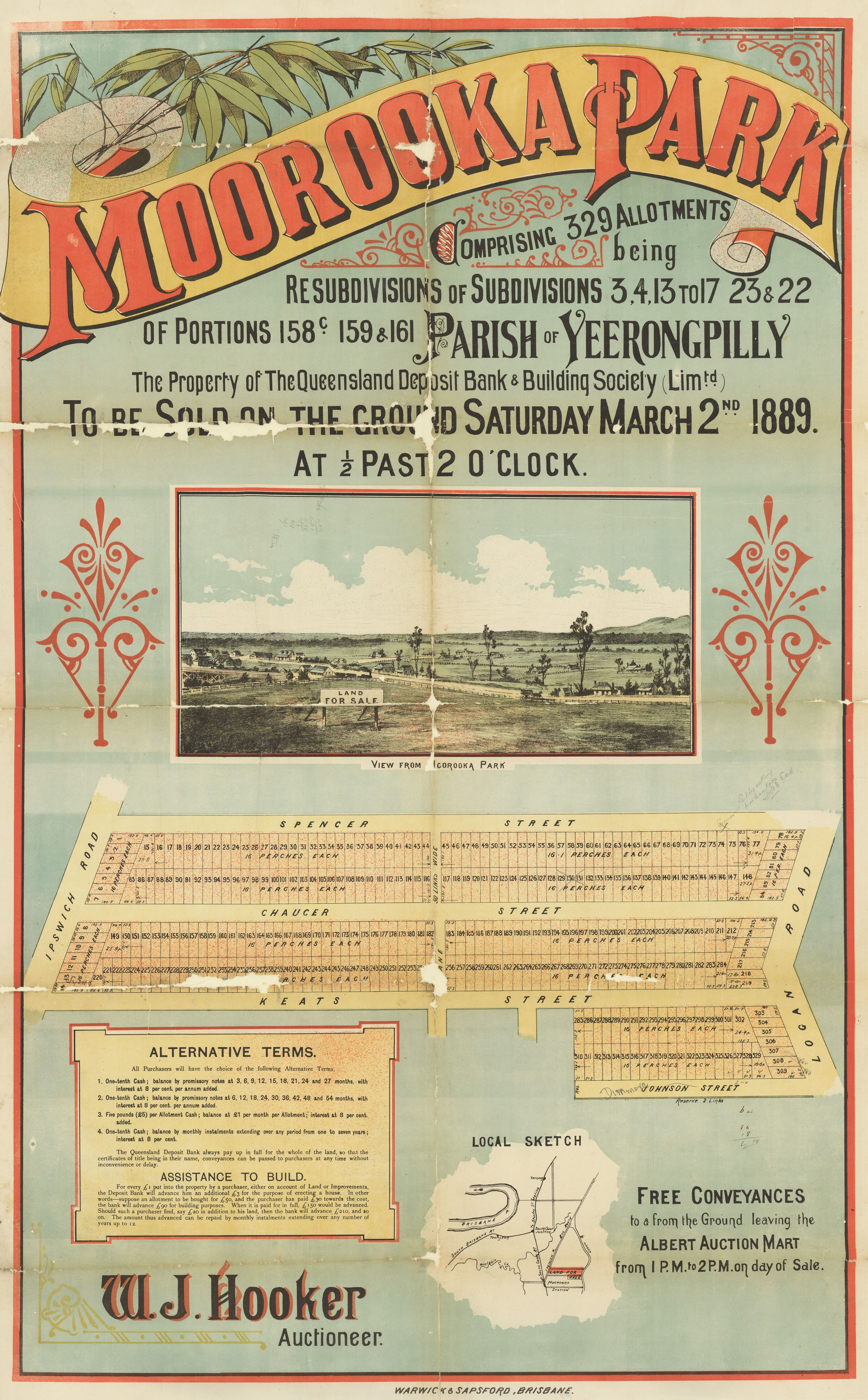
Moorooka Park subdivision map, 1889

The word Moorooka is an Indigenous word, possibly meaning iron bark or nose.

The suburb was founded as a stop-over for journeys from Brisbane south (Logan and Albert river valleys) and south-west (Ipswich and beyond). A section of the suburb's eastern boundary lies adjacent to Toohey Forest Park.

In April 1884, "Fairmount Estate" made up of 128 allotments was advertised to be auctioned by E. Hooker and Son. The Estate covered an area of Moorooka. The classified advertisement for the auction states for sale were '128 choice allotments, being re-subdivisions of subdivisions 1, 2 and 7 of Portion 158, Parish of Yeerongpilly'. Fairmount Estate was described as having, 'close proximity to the city', timber and permanent water 'close at hand', 'splendid quality' soil for gardening, 'no gullies to till up', a 'railway line passing the Estate, which will in a short time be open for traffic', a 'state school close', and a 'Grocer, Draper, Butcher, Baker, Blacksmith, and others already established in business in the locality of the Estate'.

In March 1889, auctioneer W. J. Hooker sold a suburban subdivision called "Moorooka Park Estate", consisting of 329 allotments bounded by Ipswich Road, Spencer Street (now Gainsborough Street), Logan Road (now Beaudesert Road), Johnson Street (now Dinmore Street) and Keats Street. The subdivision was close to the Moorooka railway station (on the western side of Ipswich Road) and was described as having good soil and elevated sites with "no swamps, no gullies, no broken land".

In May 1889, "Moorooka Railway Station Estate", consisting of 82 allotments was advertised to be auctioned by Arthur Martin and Company. A map advertising the auction states the Estate was bounded by Ipswich Road and Yeronga Road (now Fairfield Road). The classified advertisement for the auction states for sale were '80 choice allotments, being part of Portion 125, Parish Yerongpilly'. "Moorooka Railway Station Estate" was described as 'the position is admirable, being only five miles by rail from the city, where train stops every few minutes in the day', and 'takes in a wide scope of most interesting and charming rural and suburban views'.

A police presence existed by 1906, but a new police station was subject of tender in May 1915, and purchased for £659 (about A$48,300 in 2020).

=== Post-WW1 ===
In June 1920, "Grand View Estate", consisting of 42 allotments was advertised to be auctioned by Cameron Bros and R. G. Watson. A map advertising the auction states the Estate was 'right at the top of the hill within 7 minutes of the Railway Station. The classified advertisement for the auction states for sale were '40 magnificent allotments' which were described as 'adjoining the residence of Thomas Tonks, Esq.'

In July 1927, auctioneers W. Small and Company sold a suburban subdivision called "Dora Vale Estate", consisting of 83 allotments of 24 to 48 perches on Vale Street, Dora Street, Clyde Street and Sinclair and bounded by Main Street (now Gainsborough Street) to the south and Beaudesert Road to the west. The allotments were described as "high and dry and commanding excellent views" and were convenient to the train, tram and bus services with promises that Ipswich Road and Beaudesert Road would soon be sealed with bitumen. Also in July 1927, Clacher Brothers in conjunction with M. J. Trotter sold the "Hollywood Estate", consisting of 24 allotments on the south side of Forrest Street bounded by Fairy Street to the west and an unnamed proposed street (now Vale Street) to the east. In August 1927, the Queensland Development Company sold the "Mayfield Gardens Estate, consisting of 490 allotments (474 residential and 16 commercial) centred around Vendale Avenue and bounded to the west by Beaudesert Road, to the south by Mayfield Road and to the east by Tarragindi Road.

Moorooka State School opened on 28 January 1929.

Saint Brendan's Catholic Primary School was established on 28 January 1929 by the Sisters of Saint Joseph.

In 1931, the Annerley Church of Christ commenced outreach in Moorooka, following from the establishment of a Bible school in Clifton Hill in the home of Mr P. Ryan in February 1929. Land was purchased at 108 Beaudesert Road (27.5305°S 153.0241°E) and a church was erected by volunteers held on two successive Saturdays in May 1931, with the church holding its first service on 26 July 1931 with an official opening on Friday 31 July 1931. Initially financially supported by the Annerley church, the Moorooka church became independent in 1933. Since at least 2016, the church has been renamed as the Rising Sun International Church.

Trams ran along Beaudesert Road, thence along Ipswich Road to the Brisbane CBD. The tram service to Moorooka commenced in 1937. The service commenced at the Brisbane CBD and then went along Ipswich Road and Beaudesert Road.

In August 1937, auctioneers F. G. Pearce sold a suburban subdivision called Coniston Park Estate, consisting of 96 allotments, bounded by Beaudesert Road, Bracken Street, Margaret Street (now Medina Street) and Sherley Street. The estate was adjacent to Moorooka State School and the Moorooka tram terminus and provided "extensive views with every convenience" including electric light, mains water and gas.

During World War II, Moorooka hosted a military leave and transit depot staging camp.

The 1940s–1960s Moorooka Aboriginal Camp was at the end of Mayfield Road. Part of the camp was subject to a government clear-out by 1951.

=== Post-WW2 ===
Moorooka has traditionally hosted a working class population stemming from its history as a manufacturing hub during World War II. The southern part of Moorooka bordering Salisbury was the location of government-built returned servicemen housing.

Post-war, Brian O'Neill, great-grandson of pioneer South Brisbane land baron James Toohey, consolidated some of the family land holdings to construct a housing subdivision on the eastern edge of Moorooka bordering Toohey Forest, the streets named for his children: Timothy, Rachael, Sharon, Charmaine, and Kerrianne.

Moorooka State Infants School opened on 27 January 1959; it closed on 11 July 1983.

Saint Mary the Virgin Anglican Church was dedicated on 6 December 1959 by Archbishop Reginald Halse. Its closure on 5 April 1998 was approved by Assistant Bishop Ron Williams.

In 1968, the Brisbane City Council built and opened The Moorooka Bowls Club, which then hosted Queen Elizabeth II on her visit to the 1982 Commonwealth Games. The original bowls club went into receivership in 2019. In 2022 the building's tender was awarded to the not-for-profit organisation The Third Place Group, in order to establish a community space that all Moorookans could enjoy.

=== 2000s onwards ===
The Brisbane City Archives (a collection of local historical records dating back to 1859) was established at Moorooka.

Between the early and mid-2000s, Moorooka saw newer arrivals of African settlers from South Sudan, Somalia and Ethiopia. The suburb has been the familiar home of the African diaspora and is known as the "Little Africa" of Brisbane.

== Demographics ==
In the 2016 census, the population of Moorooka was 10,368, 50.1% female and 49.9% male. The median age of the Moorooka population was 35 years of age, three years below the Australian median of 38. 67.7% of people living in Moorooka were born in Australia, compared to the national average of 66.7%. The other top responses for country of birth were New Zealand (3.0%), England (2.6%), India (2.5%), Vietnam (1.0%), Iran (0.8%). 74.2% of people spoke only English at home; the next most popular languages were 1.4% Vietnamese, 1.1% Spanish, 1.1% Punjabi, 1.0% Mandarin, 0.9% Greek.

In the 2021 census, Moorooka had a population of 10,783 people.

== Heritage listings ==
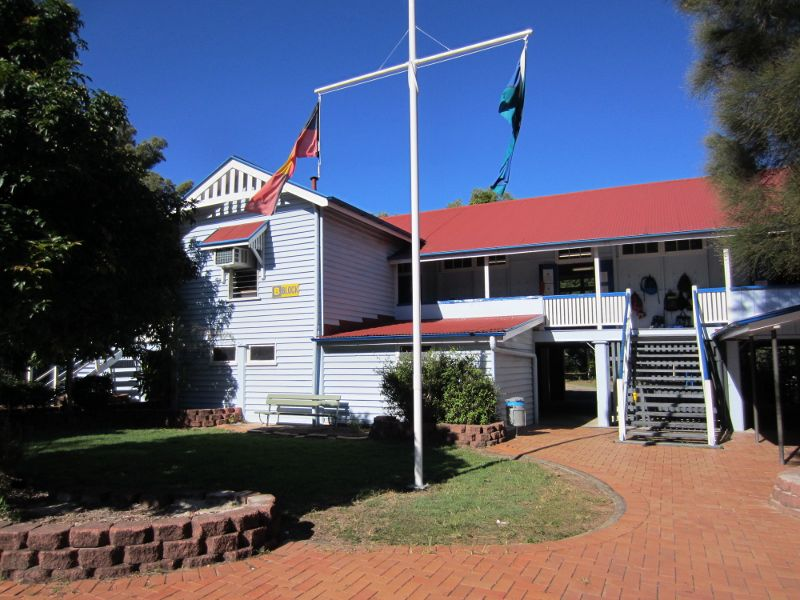
Heritage building at Moorooka State School, 2015

Moorooka has a number of heritage-listed sites, including:

- Moorooka State School, Sherley Street

== Education ==
Moorooka State School is a government primary (Prep-6) school for boys and girls at Sherley Street (27.5357°S 153.0239°E). In 2017, the school had an enrolment of 341 students with 34 teachers (25 full-time equivalent) and 24 non-teaching staff (17 full-time equivalent). It includes a special education program. It has a strong multi-cultural community and hosts an annual Festival in July.

Saint Brendan's Primary School is a Catholic primary (Prep-6) school for boys and girls at Hawtree Street (27.5374°S 153.0192°E). In 2017, the school had an enrolment of 80 students with 15 teachers (10 full-time equivalent) and 13 non-teaching staff (5 full-time equivalent).

There are no secondary schools in Moorooka. The nearest government secondary school is Yeronga State High School in Yeronga to the north.

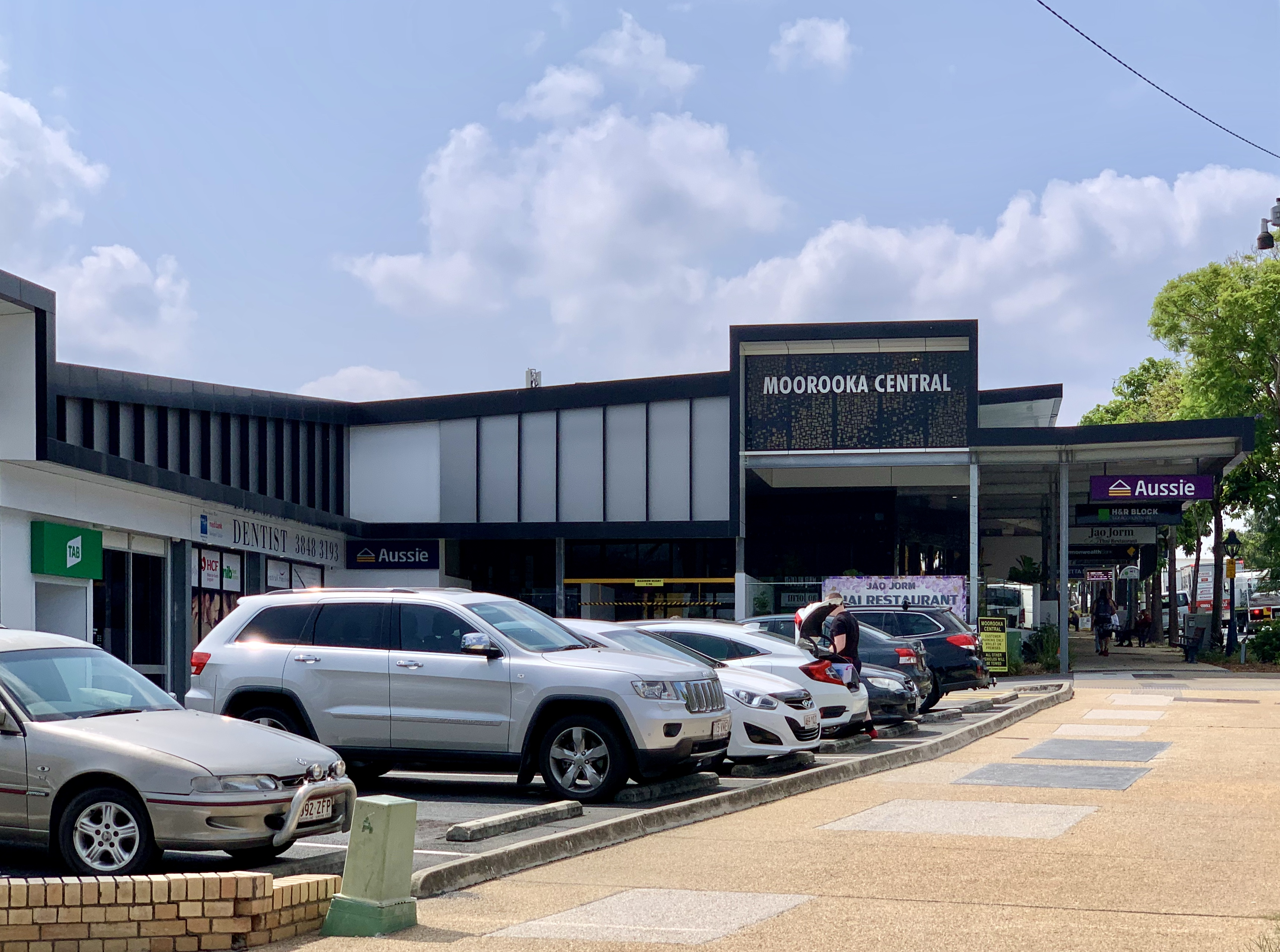
Moorooka Central shopping centre, 2020
