= Salisbury, Queensland =

Suburb of Brisbane, Australia

Salisbury
- Suburb
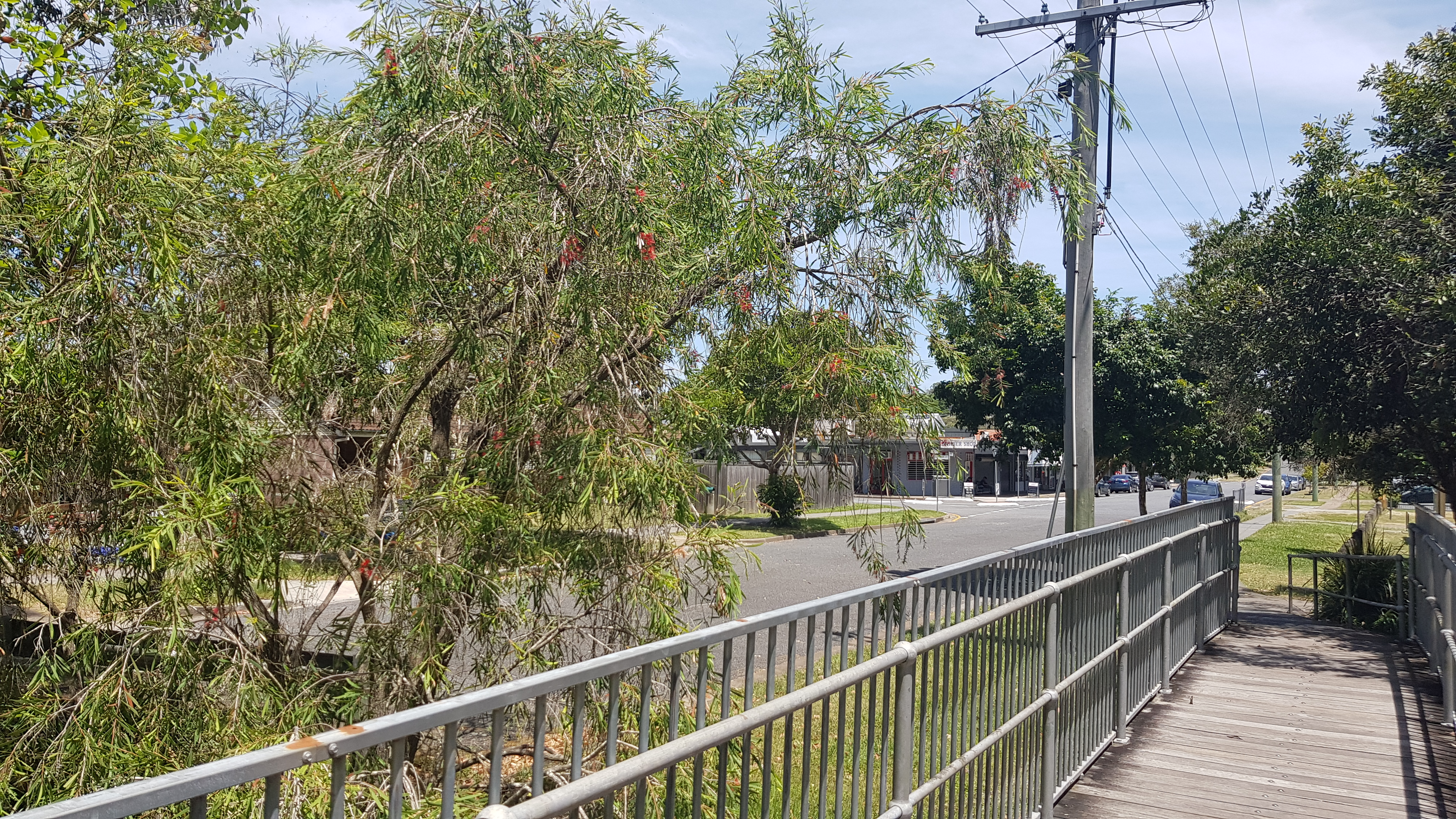
- Ainsworth Street, 2022

- Interactive map of Salisbury
- Coordinates: 27.5519°S 153.0311°E
- Country: Australia
- State: Queensland
- City: Brisbane
- LGA: City of Brisbane (Moorooka Ward)
- Location: 13 km (8.1 mi) S of Brisbane CBD

Government
  - State electorate: Toohey
  - Federal division: Moreton

Area
  - Total: 4.6 km^{2} (1.8 sq mi)

Population
  - Total: 6,790 (2021 census)
  - Density: 1,476/km^{2} (3,820/sq mi)
- Time zone: UTC+10:00 (AEST)
- Postcode: 4107
Suburbs around Salisbury
Moorooka	Moorooka	Tarragindi
Rocklea	Salisbury	Nathan
Rocklea	Coopers Plains	Coopers Plains

Salisbury is a southern suburb in the City of Brisbane, Queensland, Australia. In the 2021 census, Salisbury had a population of 6,790 people.

== Geography ==
Salisbury is 12.4 kilometres (8 mi) by road south of the Brisbane GPO.

Toohey Mountain and Toohey Mountain Reserve is located on the north east boundary of the suburb.

Today, Salisbury is an established residential and industrial area, with substantial park lands in the north.

== History ==
Salisbury was named after the residence of William Coote, an early Brisbane engineer, architect, journalist and political figure, who lived in the area. It is presumed to refer to Salisbury in England.

The Beenleigh railway line opened in 1885 which included the Salisbury railway station to service the area.

Rocklea started to develop before Salisbury, with the Logan Railway estate auctioned on 2 May 1885, advertising that the estate was near Salisbury railway station.

On 20 July 1912, the Salisbury Township Estate was advertised to be sold on site by Arthur Blackwood. The estate was located off Main Road (now known as Lilian Avenue) and consisted of 442 predominantly 32 perch (800 square metres (8,600 sq ft)) blocks, between Lillian Ave, Cripps Street, Fairlie Terrace and Rocky Water Holes.

On 23 November 1918, Mountain View Estate, Salisbury located off Main Road (now known as Lilian Avenue) was advertised to be auctioned at 3 o'clock on site, by auctioneer A. S. Phillips and Sons Limited. The estate consisted of 26 half-acre allotments and four two-acre blocks. The allotments were advertised as situated on a high position between Salisbury and Coopers Plains railway stations and opposite the site purchased by the Queensland Government for the proposed State School.

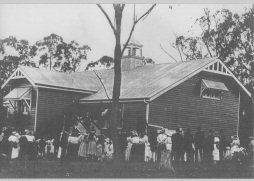
Salisbury State School, at its opening, 1920

=== Post-WW I ===
Salisbury State School opened on 27 May 1920.

The School Estate Salisbury was advertised for auction on Saturday 14 May 1921. Seventy-five residential sites were sold by Cameron Brothers next to Salisbury State School and within 10 minutes walk to Salisbury Railway station.

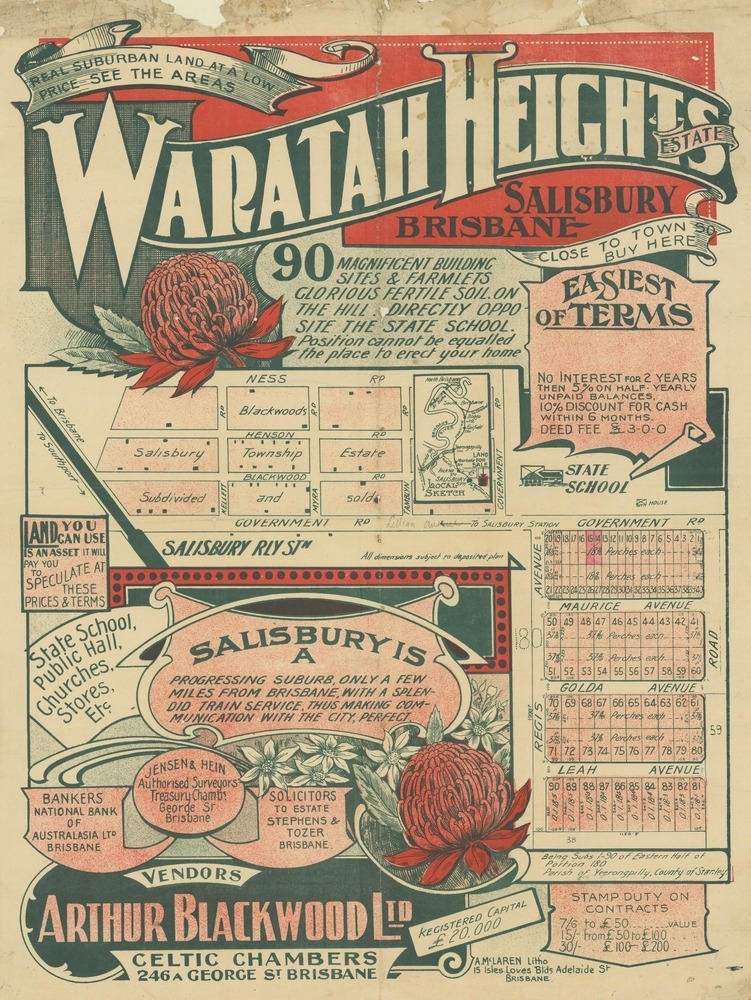
Real estate map of Waratah Heights Estate, Salisbury, 1924

The Waratah Heights Estate was sold on 17 May 1924 by Arthur Blackwood Ltd. There were 90 suburban lots in the vicinity of Golda Avenue (27.5569°S 153.0342°E).

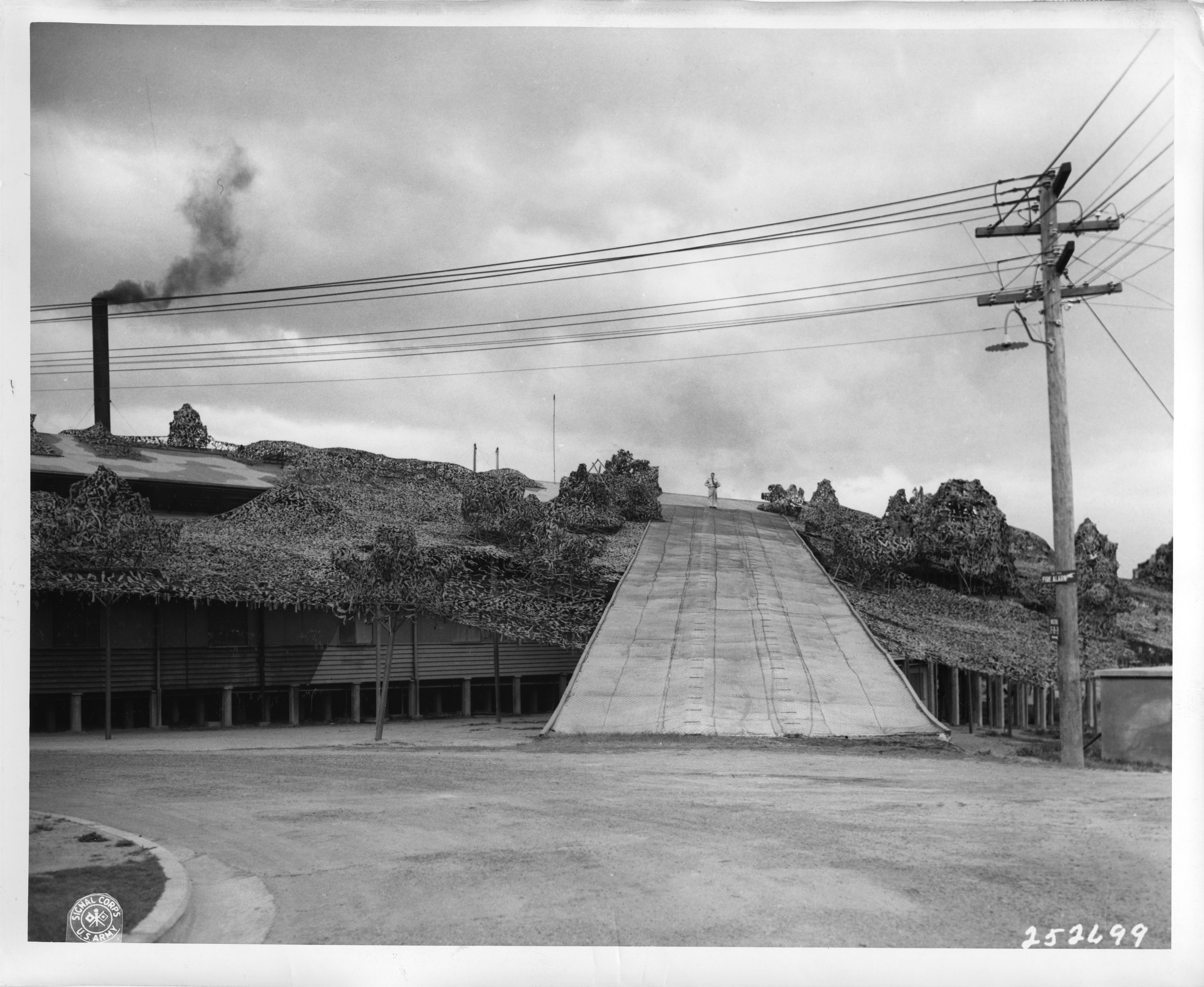
Rocklea munitions factory camouflaged by a false road and leaves over the roof of the buildings, 1943

The area remained predominantly rural until World War II. Because of its comparative remoteness, a series of munition factories were built in the area. In November 1941, the Rocklea Munitions Works was opened to make small arms ammunition and artillery shells for the Australian Army. The buildings were camouflaged from above. The site was on a land parcel of over 80 acres (32 ha) on the corner of Compo Road (now Evans Road) and Industries Road (27.5439°S 153.0287°E). It was the largest construction in Queensland during World War II.

By the end of October 1943, the production of small arms at the Rocklea Factory had ceased and the factory was repurposed to overhaul engines for the US Army Air Force operating in the South-West Pacific against the Japanese.

The tram line from the city to Moorooka was extended in 1941 to Evans Road to service these factories. The tram line finally closed on 13 April 1969 when Brisbane ended all tram services.

Provision was also made for the establishment on the site of the Salisbury Hotel.

=== Post-WW II ===
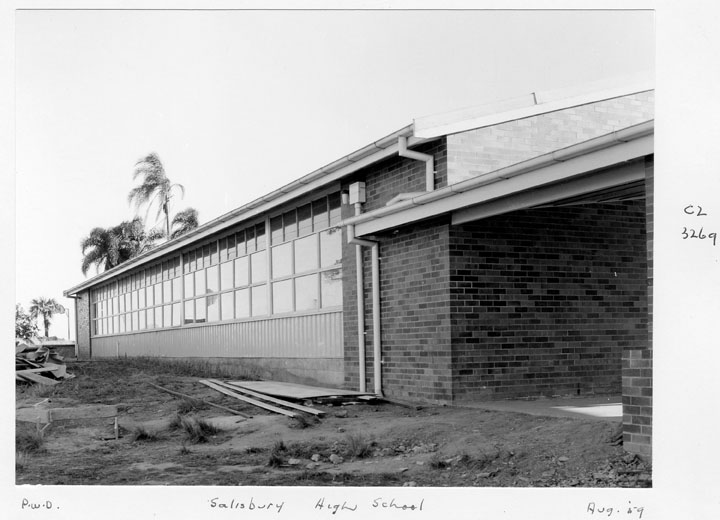
Salisbury State High School, 1959

Salisbury State High School opened on 2 February 1954 on a 10 hectares (25 acres) on Fairlie Terrace (27.5510°S 153.0222°E). On 12 December 1997, it was amalgamated with Acacia Ridge State High School to create the Nyanda State High School on the site of the Salisbury State High School. Nyanda State High School closed in 2013.

In 1955, Orange Grove Road was extended north from the eastern end of Lillian Avenue to connect to the eastern end of Evans Road. Toohey Road linked Salisbury to Tarragindi in September 1959. Significant residential development occurred during the post-war years, with rapid growth from the 1960s.

Saint Pius X Catholic School opened in 1964. The school was instigated by parish priest Father Frank Costello and is located on 3 hectares (7.4 acres) of land behind the Saint Pius X church. The school was operated by the Sisters of St Joseph of the Sacred Heart until 1981 after which it was under lay leadership.

Nyanda Station which was north of Salisbury station on Railway Avenue under the Beaudesert Road overpass was closed in November 1978. This was due to the electrification on the Beenleigh line, which because of the short distances between Salisbury and Rocklea stations, didn't allow the trains to stop in time. Also, the new Electric Multiple Unit (EMU) were too long to fit on the platform, and due to lack of space, the platform was not able to expand.

Southside Christian College opened at 109A Golda Avenue on 15 April 1985 with 16 primary students. In 2011 the school was renamed Brisbane Christian College. In June 2015 the school purchased the site of the former Nyanda State High School at 63 Fairlie Terrace for their middle and senior school campus.

Saint Mary Magdalene Anglican Church at 243–245 Douglas Road (27.5510°S 153.0320°E) was dedicated on 21 July 1997 by Archbishop Felix Arnott, replacing a World War II army hut. Its last service was held on 23 February 2014 due to a declining congregation. A deconsecration ceremony was conducted by Locum Bishop Godfrey Fryar on 28 February 2018. The first church in the district opened in a tent in 1921.

== Demographics ==
In the 2016 census, Salisbury had a population of 6,290 people, of whom 50.0% were female and 50.0% were male. The median age of the Salisbury population was 35 years, three years below the Australian median. 67.8% of people living in Salisbury were born in Australia, compared to the national average of 66.7%. The other top responses for country of birth were India (4.0%), New Zealand (2.8%), England (2.6%), China (1.9%) and Vietnam (0.8%). 74.2% of people spoke only English at home; the next most popular languages were Mandarin (2.4%), Cantonese (1.4%), Punjabi and Spanish (both 1.2%) and Gujarati (1.0).

In the 2021 census, Salisbury had a population of 6,790 people.

== Heritage listings ==
There are a number of heritage-listed sites in the suburb, including:

- 45 Assembly Street: former Rocklea Munitions Works – Shell Machining Shop & Air Raid Shelter
- 9 Chrome Street: former Rocklea Munitions Works – Oil Store and Lead Press
- 18 Chrome Street: former Rocklea Munitions Works – S.A.A. Mess
- 32 Commerce Street: former Rocklea Munitions Works – S.A.A. Case & Assembly Shop
- 100A Dollis Street: Salisbury Railway Station ticket office & footbridge (part)
- 21 Engineering Street: former Rocklea Munitions Works – Laboratory
- Evans Road (road reserve): former Rocklea Munitions Works – Northern Guard House
- 50 Evans Road: former Rocklea Munitions Works – Chronograph House & Velocity Range Building
- 124 Evans Road: former Rocklea Munitions Works – Staff Mess
- 145 Evans Road: former Rocklea Munitions Works – Southern Guard House
- 145 Henson Road: 145 Henson Road, Salisbury
- 32 Industries Road: former Rocklea Munitions Works – Magazine 8A
- 9 Precision Street: former Rocklea Munitions Works – Electrical Workshop
- 23 Precision Street: former Rocklea Munitions Works – Tools & Gauges building

== Facilities ==
Major features of the area include Toohey Forest including Toohey Mountain, The Construction Training Centre, SkillsTech Australia (Salisbury Campus), Brisbane Christian College, Life Church, Russ Hall Park, and a number of local schools, shops, aged care facilities, clubs and sporting facilities. The area is serviced by both a railway station and a number of bus routes connecting to Brisbane central business district and surrounding areas.

Salisbury railway station provides access to regular Queensland Rail City network services to Brisbane and Beenleigh.

The book publishing company Boolarong Press has its headquarters in the suburb.

Salisbury also has many public parks throughout the suburb. These include of:

- Assembly Street Park – 61/75 Assembly Street;
- Bill Moore Park – 116 Myra Road;
- Kellett Road Park – 104 Kellett Road;
- Lillian Avenue Park – 309 Lillian Avenue;
- Rosebank Square Park – 64 Rosebank Square;
- Russ Hall Park – Ainsworth Street and McCarthy Road; and
- Salisbury Reserve Reserve – 323 Evans Road.

== Education ==
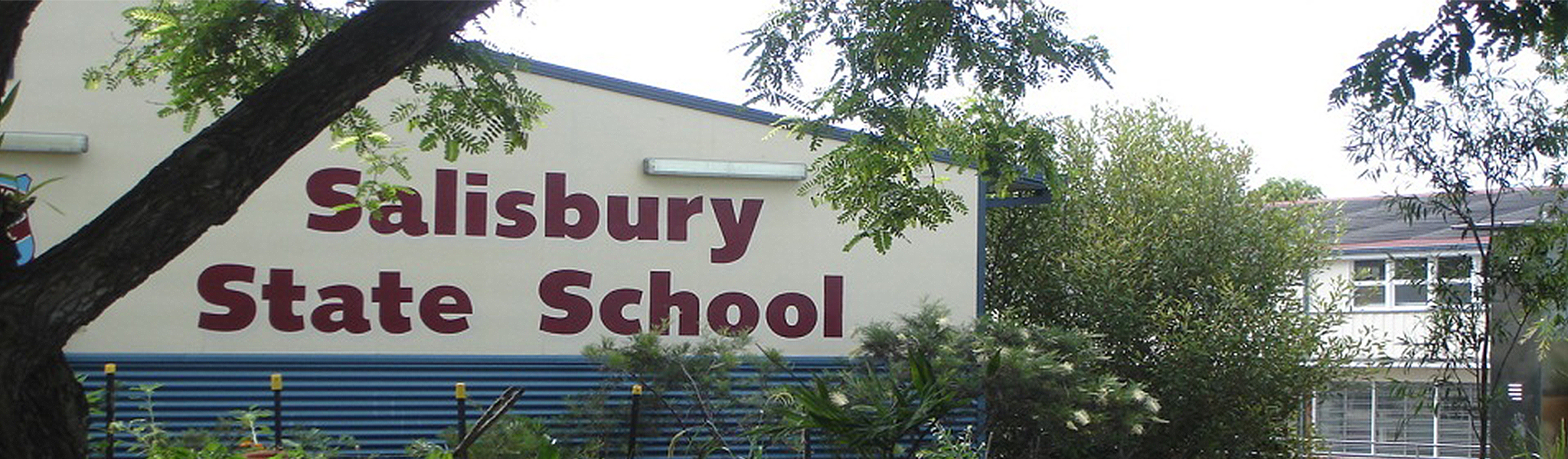
Salisbury State School, 2023

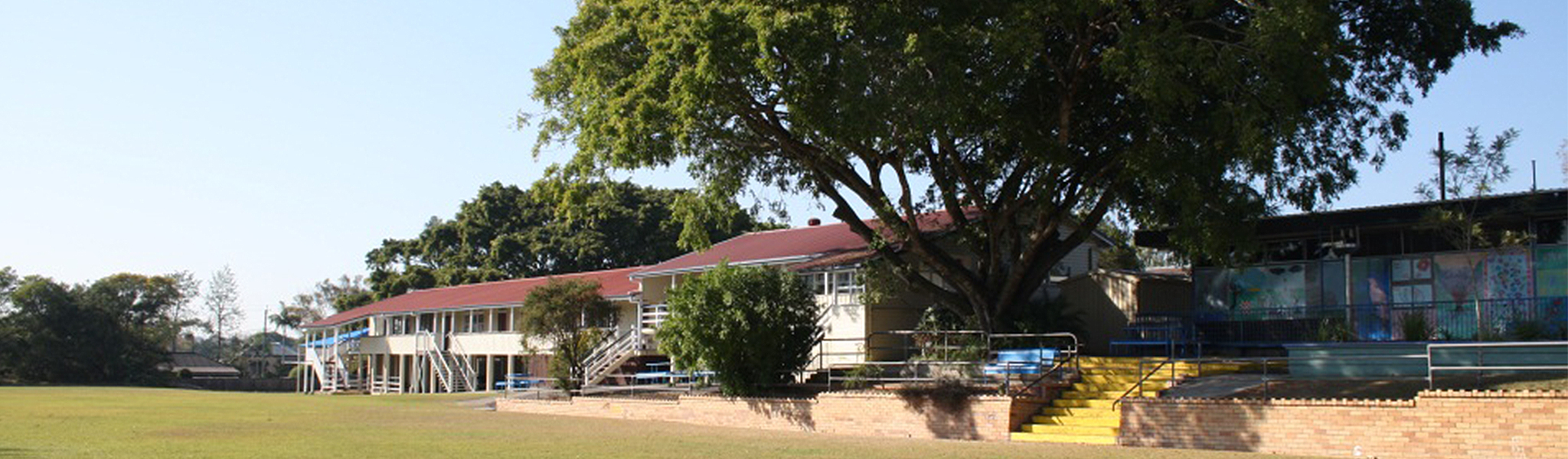
Salisbury State School, 2023

Salisbury State School is a government primary (Prep-6) school for boys and girls at 19 Cripps Street (27.5535°S 153.0321°E). In 2017, the school had an enrolment of 256 students with 22 teachers (17 full-time equivalent) and 17 non-teaching staff (11 full-time equivalent).

Saint Pius X School is a Catholic primary (Prep-6) school for boys and girls at 73 Golda Avenue (27.5576°S 153.0380°E). In 2019, the school had an enrolment of 150 students with 13 teachers (10 full-time equivalent) and 11 non-teaching staff (6 full-time equivalent).

Brisbane Christian College is a private primary and secondary school (Prep–12) school for boys and girls. It has its Prep–5 campus at 99–109 Golda Avenue (27.5578°S 153.0390°E) and its 6–12 campus at 63 Fairlie Terrace (27.5498°S 153.0209°E). In 2017, the school had an enrolment of 820 students with 58 teachers (52 full-time equivalent) and 79 non-teaching staff (38 full-time equivalent).

There are no government secondary schools in Salisbury. The nearest government secondary schools are:

- Holland Park State High School in Holland Park West to the north-east;
- Sunnybank State High School in Sunnybank to the south-east; and
- Yeronga State High School in Yeronga to the north-west.

== Transport ==
Commuter trains on the Beenleigh line stop at Salisbury railway station.

The suburb is served by Transport for Brisbane buses, namely the P119 QE2 Hospital-City route, the 120 Garden City-City route, the 121 Salisbury-Fortitude Valley route, the 124 Sunnybank-Fortitude Valley route, and the 125 Garden City-Fortitude Valley route. Also, along the Salisbury side of Beaudesert Road, the 110 Inala-City route, the 115 Calamvale-City route, and the 117 Acacia Ridge-Woolloongabba route stop at Beaudesert Rd at Moorooka South, stop 38.

Salisbury is located in the Translink zone 2.

A business case has been opened by the Government of Australia and Queensland Government for a proposed passenger rail service from Salisbury to Beaudesert, which would use the existing NSW TrainLink railway from Salisbury to Undullah, then a soon to be built railway from Undullah to Beaudesert.

=== Main roads ===
Salisbury has four major roads that run throughout the suburb:

- Metroad 2 (Kessels/Riawena Roads) to the south;
- National Route 13 (Beaudesert Road) to the west;
- State Route 11 (Orange Grove Road) to the west; and
- State Route 20 (Evans Roads) to the north.

== Residential ==
Housing predominantly consists of a variety of detached dwellings on various lot sizes, ranging from traditional Queenslander style homes on 800 square metres (8,600 sq ft) to modern style homes on 400 square metres (4,300 sq ft).

The area is undergoing change and renewal with many families seeking to make it their home.
