= Thompson Estate and Eastern Suburbs Athletics =

Thompson Estate and Eastern Suburbs Athletics is oldest sporting club in Brisbane, Queensland, Australia, founded in 1900. Run by volunteers, it caters for athletes and cross country runners of all abilities.

Notable athletes who developed at Thompson Estate and Eastern Suburbs Athletics include Jai Taurima, Bronwyn Thompson, Denise Boyd and Gerrard Gosens.
