= Nathan, Queensland =

Nathan
- Suburb
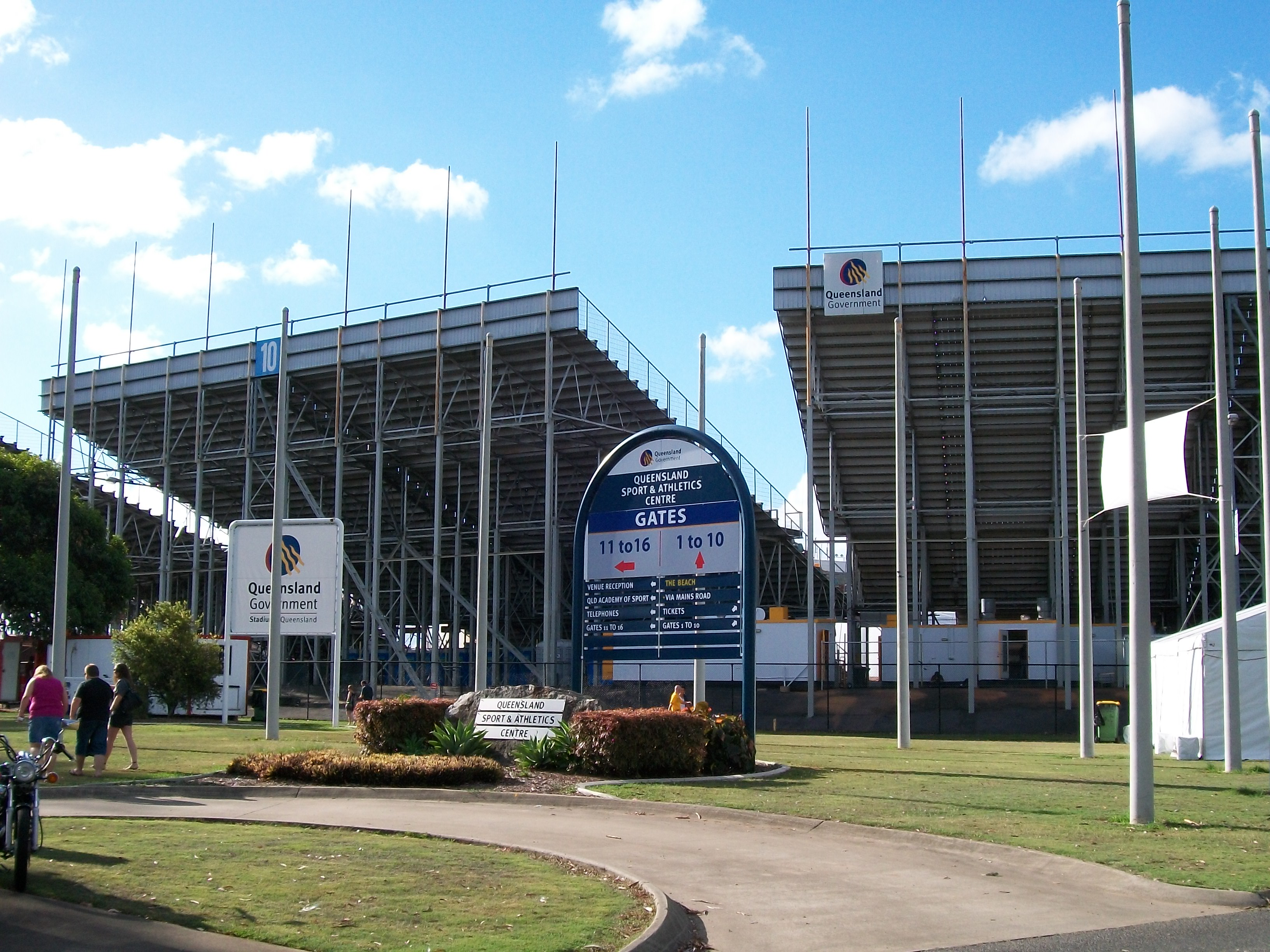
- Queensland Sport and Athletics Centre

- Interactive map of Nathan
- Coordinates: 27.5508°S 153.0533°E
- Country: Australia
- State: Queensland
- City: Brisbane
- LGA: City of Brisbane (Moorooka Ward)
- Location: 11.4 km (7.1 mi) S of Brisbane CBD
- Established: 1967

Government
  - State electorate: Toohey
  - Federal division: Moreton

Area
  - Total: 5.1 km^{2} (2.0 sq mi)

Population
  - Total: 1,085 (2021 census)
  - Density: 212.7/km^{2} (551/sq mi)
- Time zone: UTC+10:00 (AEST)
- Postcode: 4111
Suburbs around Nathan
Tarragindi	Holland Park West	Mount Gravatt
Salisbury	Nathan	Upper Mount Gravatt
Coopers Plains	Robertson	MacGregor

Nathan is a southern suburb in the City of Brisbane, Queensland, Australia. In the 2021 census, Nathan had a population of 1,085 people.

== Geography ==
Nathan is home to Toohey Forest Conservation Park, Griffith University's Nathan campus and the Queensland Sport and Athletics Centre which hosted the opening ceremony of the 1982 Commonwealth Games. The Queensland Academy of Sport currently uses the facilities located at the stadium.

The Mount Gravatt Cemetery and Crematorium is located in the suburb along Mains Road.

== History ==
The Mount Gravatt cemetery opened in 1918.

The suburb was named on 1 August 1967 after Sir Matthew Nathan, Governor of Queensland from 1920 to 1926.

== Demographics ==
In the 2011 census, the population of Nathan was 1,397, 48.4% female and 51.6% male. The median age of the Nathan population was 24 years of age, 13 years below the Australian median. Almost half of the population (41.4%) were aged in the range 15–24, compared to the national average of 13.3% in this range. 65.3% of people living in Nathan were born in Australia, compared to the national average of 69.8%. The other top responses for country of birth were New Zealand 3.6%, China 3.4%, England 2.9%, India 2.2%, Germany 1.1%. 75.6% of people spoke only English at home; the next most popular languages were 3.2% Mandarin, 1.5% Cantonese, 1.2% Vietnamese, 0.9% Indonesian, 0.8% Hindi. The most popular religious affiliation was "no religion" (32%), followed by Catholic (21%) and Anglican (13%). It was a culturally diverse suburb, with over 30% more overseas-born residents (27.57%) than the Brisbane average (21.03%). Although populated by local Aborigines until the 1940s, less than 1% of residents were indigenous Australians.

In the 2016 census, Nathan had a population of 1,183 people.

In the 2021 census, Nathan had a population of 1,085 people.

== Education ==
Toohey Forest Environmental Education Centre is an Outdoor and Environmental Education Centre at South Ring Road (27.5527°S 153.0574°E).

There are no schools in Nathan. The nearest government primary schools are Salisbury State School in neighbouring Salisbury to the west, Robertson State School in neighbouring Robertson to the south, and Upper Mount Gravatt State School in neighbouring Upper Mount Gravatt to the east. The nearest government secondary schools are Holland Park State High School in Holland Park West to the north-east, MacGregor State High School in neighbouring MacGregor to the south-east, and Sunnybank State High School in Sunnybank to the south.

== See also ==
- List of Brisbane suburbs
