= Toohey Mountain =

Mountain in Australia

- Watercourses to the north of Toohey Mountain

Highest point
- Coordinates: 27.5368°S 153.0373°E

Geography
- Location within Australia
- Location: Brisbane, Queensland, Australia

Toohey Mountain is a mountain at the eastern side of the City of Brisbane's suburb of Moorooka in Queensland, Australia. It was named after James Toohey, an Irish born Sydneysider who made his wealth in the California gold rush, before settling in the newly formed state of Queensland. To the north of the mountain is Tarragindi Hill and Wellers Hill.

Grass Tree Ridge was the name given to the tall and long ridge that extends through parts of Tarragindi, Salisbury and Nathan, towards Sunnybank.

Toohey Mountain is the site of two small reservoirs. It lies within the Oxley Creek catchment with Rocky Waters Hole Creek draining western and southern slopes, the Norman Creek catchment to the north and Bulimba Creek's catchment to the east.

Also of note, there is an old Channel 7 rebroadcasting tower located on the Melaleuca Walking Track (about 200–300 metres (656–984 ft) from the Madang Street entrance to the Fimbriata Walking Track) which although discontinued from service for many decades has recently been restored to service as a community wireless access point by the BrisMesh, a community wireless group.

== Toohey Forest Conservation Park ==
Most of the mountain is included in the Toohey Forest Conservation Park. It features many walking tracks, some of which link up with the nearby Mount Gravatt, the southside's tallest mountain and Griffith University campus in Nathan.

== See also ==
- Brisbane native plants
- Mount Petrie
