= Tarragindi =

- Suburb
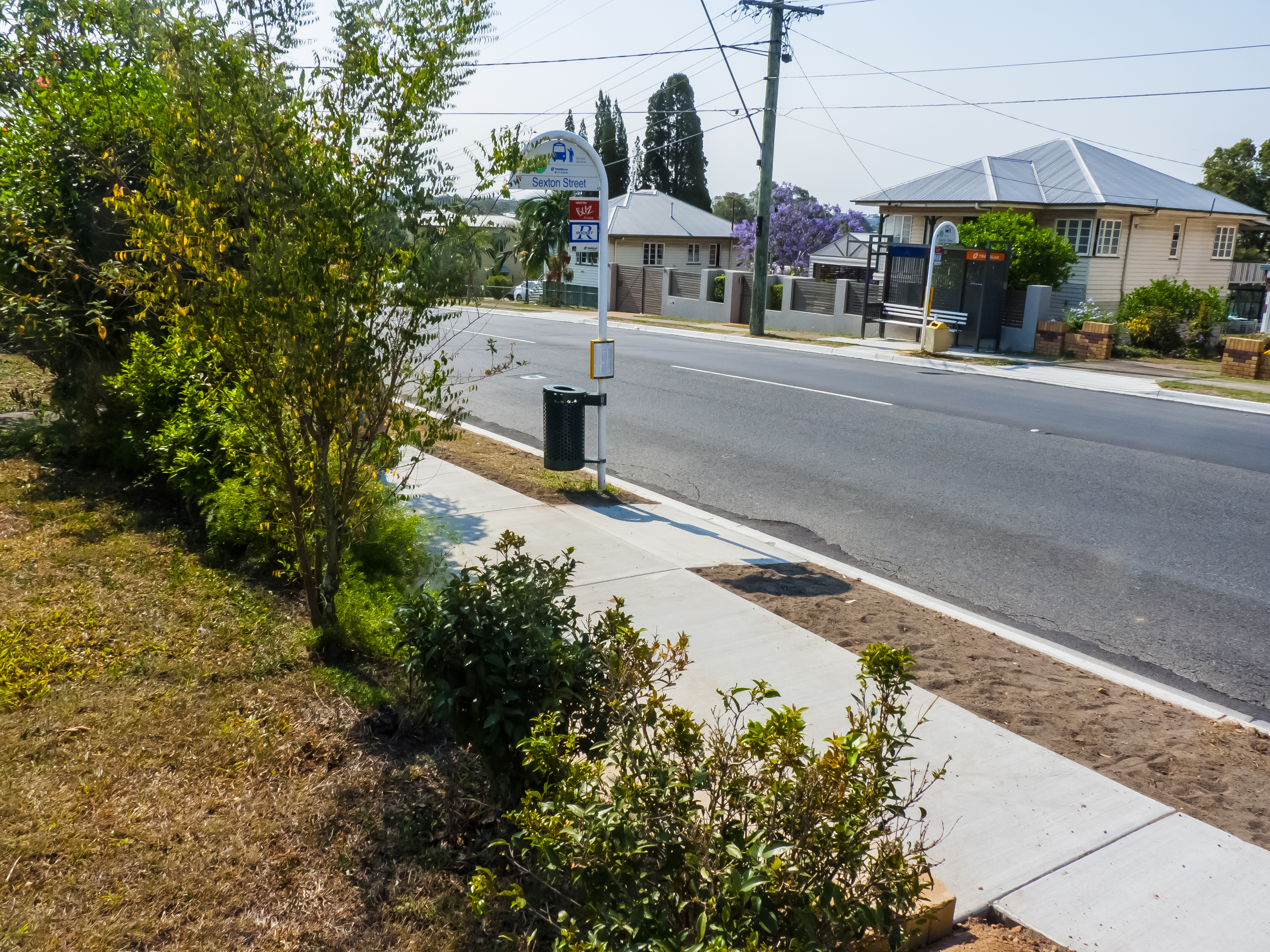
- Sexton Street, 2012

- Interactive map of Tarragindi
- Coordinates: 27.5275°S 153.0464°E
- Country: Australia
- State: Queensland
- City: Brisbane
- LGA: City of Brisbane
- Location: 9 km (5.6 mi) S of Brisbane CBD
- Established: 1857

Government
  - State electorate: Miller
  - Federal division: Moreton

Area
  - Total: 4.5 km^{2} (1.7 sq mi)
- Elevation: 58 m (190 ft)

Population
  - Total: 11,035 (2021 census)
  - Density: 2,452/km^{2} (6,350/sq mi)
- Postcode: 4121
Suburbs around Tarragindi
Annerley	Greenslopes	Greenslopes
Moorooka	Tarragindi	Holland Park West
Salisbury	Nathan	Mount Gravatt

Tarragindi (/tærəɡɪndi/) is a southern suburb of the City of Brisbane, Queensland, Australia. It is represented through the Holland Park and Moorooka Ward councillors on the Brisbane City Council. In the 2021 census, Tarragindi had a population of 11,035 people.

== Geography ==
Drainage of Tarragindi creeks

The suburb boundaries are largely defined by the Southeast Freeway and Toohey Forest. Ekibin Road (East) and streets skirting the Tarragindi Reservoir form the western boundary. Prior Street and Mayfield Road mark the start of the southern limits of the suburb.

The main part of the suburb lies in a valley running north–south, surrounded by ridges marked by Wellers Hill (the highest point) to the east and Tarragindi Hill to the west. Sandy Creek has it source in Toohey Forest to the south and flows through the major part of the suburb. The eastern flank of the Wellers Hill ridge drains into Ekibin Creek.

== History ==
=== Origin of the name ===
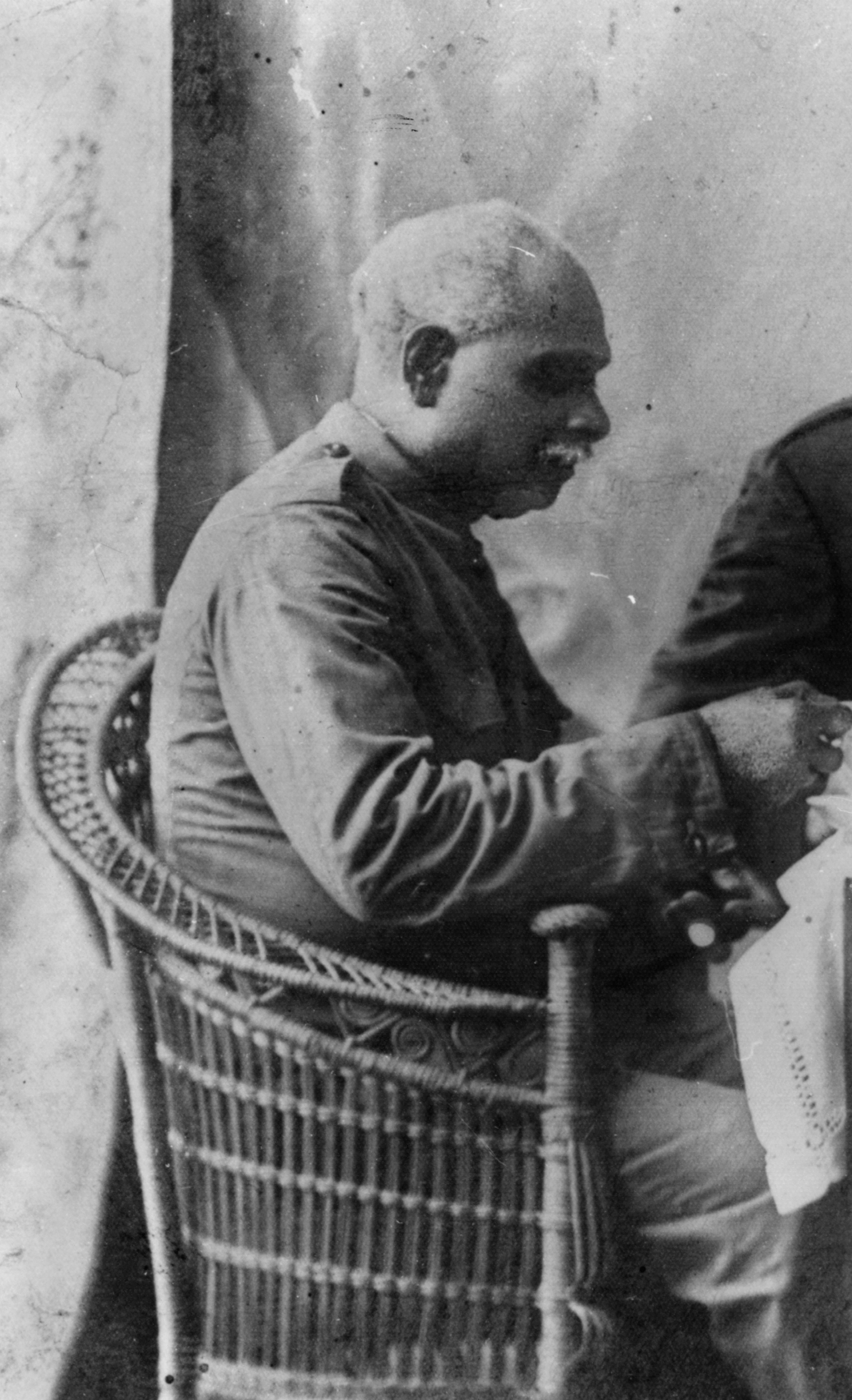
Tarragindi Tasserone

The suburb was named after a native from the Loyalty Islands (near modern-day New Caledonia) who was transported in the late nineteenth century to Queensland. Such people, called Kanakas, were a cheap source of labour for sugarcane production. Apparently Tarragindi Tasserone escaped and was subsequently employed by Alfred Foote of Ipswich. Later, he cleared land for William Grimes (related to Alfred Foote) on a hill near Sandy Creek and the property was named after him. Tarragindi remained with the Foote family in Ipswich until just before he died on 13 January 1913, aged 63. He worked for the Foote family for over 25 years. The grave of Tarra Gindi Tasserone is located in the Ipswich General Cemetery.

=== Indigenous history ===
Prior to European occupation beginning in the early 19th century the area covered by the suburb was inhabited by Aboriginal people. The Coorparoo sub-group of the wider Jagera group occupied land south of the Brisbane River clustered around Oxley, Norman and Bulimba creeks. It is also possible that the Yerongpan sub-group lived in the area. The Coorparoo group had cultural links to other neighbouring communities including territorially-neutral pathways, river crossings and ceremonies. A bora ring was known to have been maintained in Tarragindi, possibly between present-day Barnehurst and Isabella Streets. One trace of this early occupation persists in the locality and creek name, "Ekibin". According to Queensland Department of Natural Resources and Mines (2003) the modern name is derived from the aboriginal "Yekkabin" which referred to aquatic plants (probably Telmatoblechnum indicum) with edible roots which grew in the creek. The edible roots were common in the diet of Aboriginals of the Moreton Bay area; a sharp stick was used to dig out the stem, which was then dried, roasted, and pounded with a stone.

=== European settlement ===
European settlement began 1857 with a survey of land by George Pratten. An early land-owner (and later Mayor of Brisbane and member of parliament), Thomas Stephens, established a woolscour and later a fellmongery in the northern part of the suburb near Essie Avenue. Another land-holder was James Toohey who leased properties for cattle runs.

=== Land sales ===
In October 1914 "Cracknell Hill Estate", made up of 115 allotments of 16 perches, was advertised for sale by Isles Love & Co., Auctioneers. The map advertising the sale states that the estate was a five minute walk from the proposed new tram terminus at Chardon's Hotel.

On 17 April 1920, auctioneers Cameron Brothers offered 97 allotments (mostly 16 perches) in the "Cracknell Hill Estate" which were in Queen Street (now Cavan Street), Hamlet Terrace (now Hamlet Street) and Woodville Place between Warwick Street (now Marjorie Street) and Percy Street. These appear to be unsold allotments of an estate first offered in October 1914.

In August 1924 Marcus F. Lyons & Winning advertised 312 allotments for private sale in the "Cracknel Road Estate", being subdivisions 1 to 313 of resubdivision 1 and 2 of portion 113, Parish of Yeerongpilly. A map advertising the sale states the estate is 5 minutes from Ipswich Road Trams, water main and electricity passes through the estate; and gas is handy to the estate.

=== World War II ===
Ekibin Memorial Park

During the Second World War, Tarragindi was the site of a field hospital administered first by the American Army (for soldiers treated for shell shock) and later by the British and Australian forces. The Ekibin Hospital was bounded by Sexton Street and Toohey Road and encompassed parts of Cracknell, Effingham, Fingal and Lutzow streets. After the war, the site was used by the Housing Commission to accommodate displaced persons. Today, little remains of the establishment except for possible foundations of a gun emplacement in the midsection of Fingal Street. The Ekibin Memorial Park on Cracknell Road commemorates the establishment of the hospital.

=== After World War II ===
St Barnabas' Anglican Church was dedicated on 2 August 1959 by Archbishop Reginald Halse. It closed in April 1989.

== Demographics ==
In the 2011 census, Tarragindi recorded a population of 9,965 people, 51.3% female and 48.7% male. The median age of the Tarragindi population was 37 years, the same as the national median. 80.2% of people living in Tarragindi were born in Australia, compared to the national average of 69.8%. The other top responses for country of birth were England 3.6%, New Zealand 2.5%, South Africa 0.6%, India 0.5%, Vietnam 0.5%. 88.1% of people spoke only English at home; the next most popular languages were 1.1% Greek, 0.7% Spanish, 0.6% Vietnamese, 0.6% Italian, 0.5% German.

In the 2016 census, Tarragindi had a population of 10,779 people.

In the 2021 census, Tarragindi had a population of 11,035 people, 50.6% female and 49.4% male. The median age of the Tarragindi population was 37 years, one below the national median. 80% of people living in Tarragindi were born in Australia, above England 3%, New Zealand 2.1%, Japan 1.2%, India 0.8%, and China 0.8%. 84.8% of people spoke only English at home; the next most popular languages were Japanese 2.2%, Mandarin 1.3%, Greek 1.2%, Vietnamese 0.9% and Spanish 0.8%.

== Education ==
Wellers Hill State School

Tarragindi hosts two primary schools.

Wellers Hill State School is located on the junction of Weller and Toohey Roads. The school has a very active music program which is renowned within the area and has flourished under the care of several dedicated musical instructors. The motto of this school is 'Strive to Succeed' and this motto is upheld visibly in the conduct of student and teacher. Its sports houses, named after Australian native animals, are Platypus (yellow), Emu (blue), Kangaroo (red), and Koala (green). In December 2006 and June 2013 the school lost some buildings due to arson attacks. The school introduced a Japanese Bilingual in program in 2014 and offers a student exchange program with its sister school from Yasugi in Japan.

St. Elizabeth's Catholic Primary School is located at 55 Effingham Street on the corner of Cracknell Road and is part of the Annerley Ekibin Parish Mary Immaculate Church, Annerley. The school has 3 sporting houses, all named after people involved in the school's development and significant people in the Christian faith: Bergin (gold) named after Fr Basil Bergin the first parish priest when the school opened, Elliot (red) which is named after Fr Graham Elliott who was a parish priest at St Elizabeth's from 1976–1999 and Nagle (blue) which is named after Nano Nagle. The school's motto is "Caritas Christi", which is displayed on the boys' uniform and on the balcony of the Christi Centre where the students participate in art & music. There is an OSHC Centre downstairs. The school has a chapel, which used to be a church until the installation of the Prep Rooms.

There are no secondary schoools in Tarragindi. The nearest government secondary schools are Holland Park State High School in neighbouring Holland Park West to the east and Yeronga State High School in Yeronga to the west.
