= Olia Burtaev =

Australian synchronised swimmer

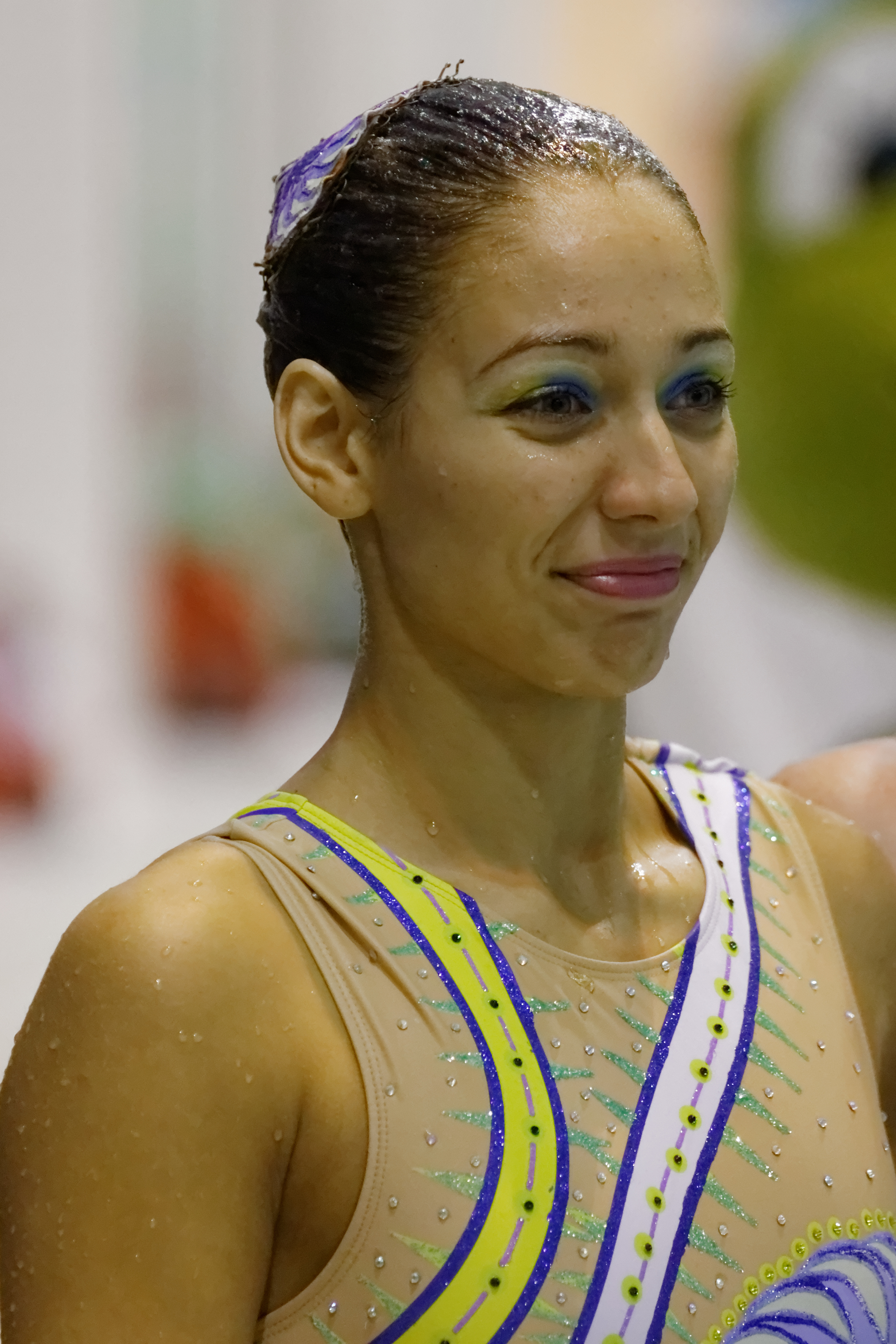
- Burtaev in 2013

Personal information
- Nickname: Olia
- Nationality: Australian
- Born: Olga Burtaev; 18 June 1995 (age 31) Brisbane, Queensland
- Height: 170 cm (5.6 ft) (2012)
- Weight: 54 kg (119 lb) (2012)

Sport
- Country: Australia
- Sport: Synchronized swimming
- Club: Gold Coast Mermaids
- Coached by: Anna Nepotacheva, Marina Kholod

Olga "Olia" Burtaev (born 18 June 1995) is an Australian synchronised swimmer. Burtaev joined Australia's National Team at 14 years of age, and made her international debuts at the 2010 Swiss Open and the 2010 FINA Synchronised Swimming World Cup. Burtaev competed for Australia at the 2012 Summer Olympics, and represented the nation at the 2011 and 2013 World Aquatics Championships.

== Personal life ==
Burtaev was born on 18 June 1995 in Brisbane, Queensland. She spent her childhood in the Brisbane area, and took dance classes. She attended Mt Gravatt East State School before going to high school at Mansfield State High School. She is trilingual, speaking English, French and Russian. As a child, she wanted to be a ballerina. As of 2012, she lives in Gold Coast, Queensland. Burtaev is 170 centimetres (5 ft 7 in) tall and weighs 54 kilograms (119 lb).

== Synchronised swimming ==
Burtaev began synchronised swimming at ten years old, and is a member of Gold Coast Mermaids Synchronised Swimming Club (GCMSSC).

Burtaev finished 4th in the team event at the 2010 Swiss Open in Arbon, Switzerland. She finished 11th in the team event at the 2010 FINA World Cup in China. She finished 18th in the technical team event at the 2011 FINA World Championships in Shanghai, China. She finished 17th in the team event at the 2011 FINA World Championships in Shanghai, China. She finished 9th in the team event at the 2011 German Open in Bonn, Germany and 6th in the team event at the 2011 French Open in Paris, France. The FINA World Championships held in Shanghai, China served as the 2012 Olympic qualifying event for the team. In the technical team portion, her team finished 18th and in the Free Team event, her team finished 17th.

In 2012, she was selected to represent Australia at the 2012 Summer Olympics in synchronized swimming along with team-mates Eloise Amberger, Jenny-Lyn Anderson, Sarah Bombell, Tamika Domrow, Bianca Hammett, Tarren Otte, Francesca Owen and Samantha Reid. At 17, Burtaev was the youngest member of the Australian squad. Burtaev was also scheduled to perform a solo synchro routine, along with some of the other members of the team.

In 2013, Burtaev and Bianca Hammett competed in the duet events at the 2013 World Aquatics Championships, placing 22nd in the Technical Duet with a score of 71.700, and placing 30th in the Free Duet with a score of 70.180. Prior to the World Championships, Burtaev and Hammett represented Australia at the 2013 French Open, and the 2013 Japan Open.
