= Groyne =

Structure extending into a body of water to alter water flow

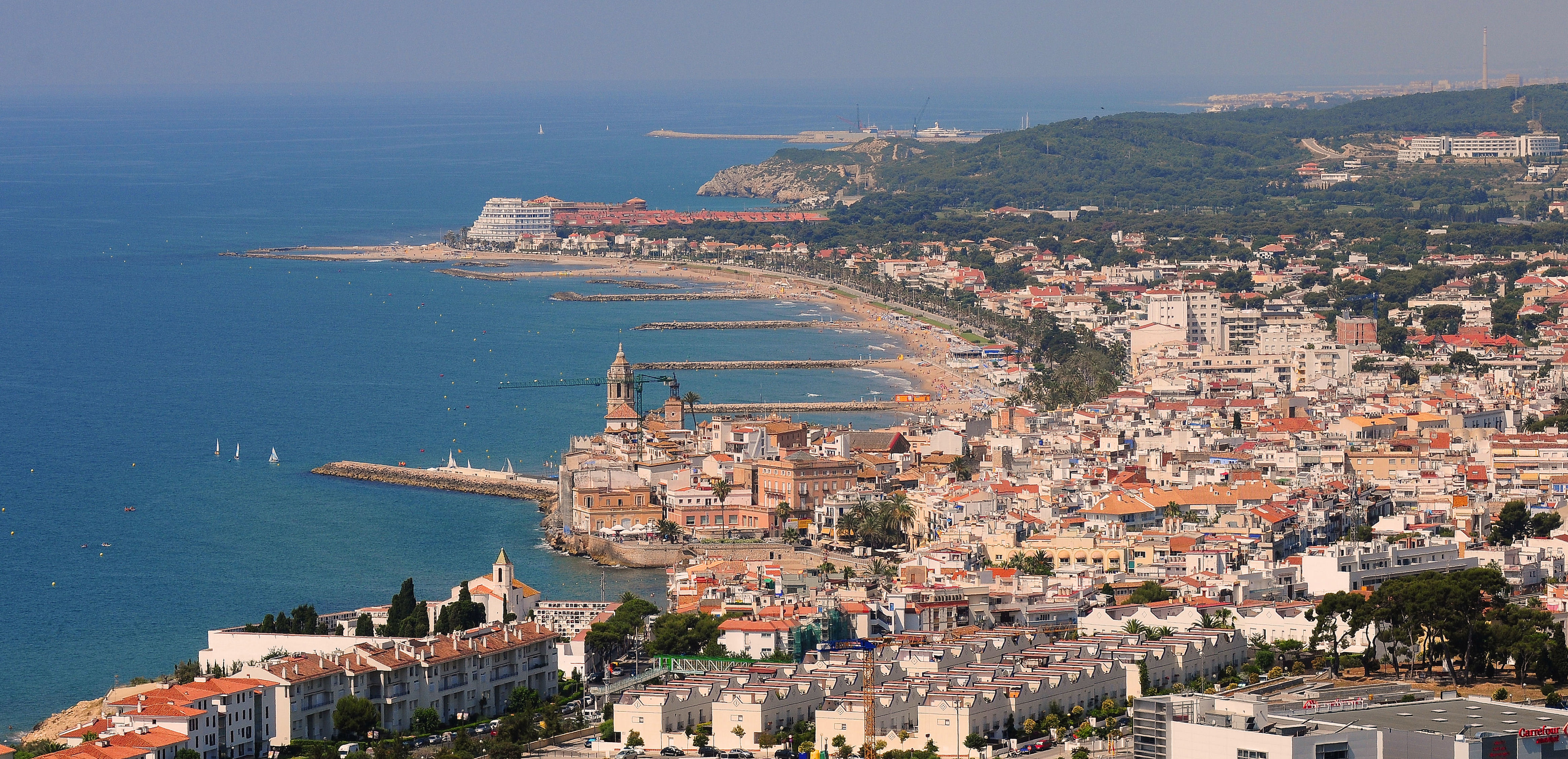
Groynes in Sitges, Catalonia, Spain

A groyne (British English) or groin (American English; see spelling differences) is a rigid aquatic structure built perpendicularly from an ocean shore (in coastal engineering) or a river bank, interrupting water flow and limiting the movement of sediment. It is usually made out of wood, concrete, or stone. In the ocean, groynes create beaches, prevent beach erosion caused by longshore drift where this is the dominant process and facilitate beach nourishment. There is also often cross-shore movement which if longer than the groyne will limit its effectiveness. In a river, groynes slow down the process of erosion and prevent ice-jamming, which in turn aids navigation.

All of a groyne may be underwater, in which case it is a submerged groyne. They are often used in tandem with seawalls and other coastal engineering features. Groynes, however, may cause a shoreline to be perceived as unnatural. Groynes are generally straight but could be of various plan view shapes, permeable or impermeable, built from various materials such as wood, sand, stone rubble, or gabion, etc.

== Background ==
=== Etymology ===
The term groyne is derived from the Old French groign, from Late Latin grunium, "snout".

=== History ===
==== Ancient Egypt and Nubia ====
A large number of groynes were found along a 1,000-kilometre stretch of the river Nile, between the first and the fourth cataract. The earliest ones dated so far were found to be over 3,000 years old, but researchers are hypothesising that the technique might already have been understood in the fourth millennium BCE. The newly discovered groynes are located in what are now Egypt (Aswan), but mainly in Sudan, in areas of ancient Nubia, some of them built by the Egyptian overlords and some possibly the work of local Nubians.

==== 16th- to 19th-century England ====
One of the earliest mentions of groynes is in connection with the planned improvements to the silted-up Dover harbour, by one Fernando Poyntz in 1582. (Note: Lemon, Robert, ed. (1865). Calendar of State Papers, Domestic series, of the reign of Elizabeth, 1581–1590. London: Longman, Green, Longman, Roberts and Green. pp. 44, 59, 67, 77, 80, 96. There were complaints by 1583 that the haven was in a worse state than in 1575 (p. 96); Poyntz was sidelined and the work was finished by Thomas Digges.)

In 1713 the first wooden groyne to protect Brighton's seafront and coastline was built, which had been heavily damaged in the Great storm of 1703, and again in 1705. In 1867, the first concrete groyne was built near East Street, Brighton as a promenade 195 feet (59 m) long.

== Mechanics ==
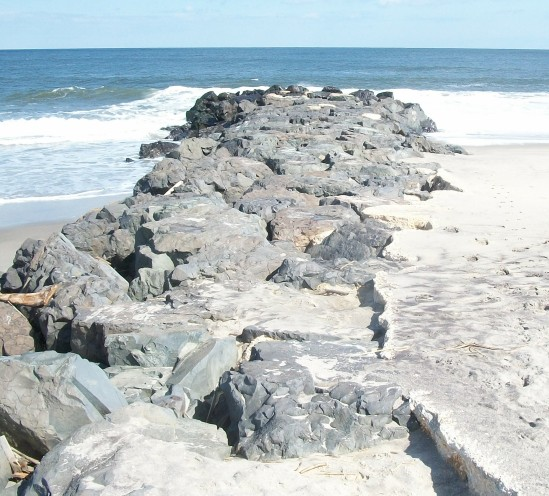
Rock groyne at Sea Bright Beach, New Jersey.

=== Beach evolution and sedimentation accretion ===
A groyne gradually creates and maintains a wide area of beach on its updrift side by trapping the sediments suspended in the ocean current. This process is called accretion of sand and gravel or beach evolution. It reduces erosion on the other, i.e. downdrift, side by reducing the speed and power of the waves striking the shore. It is a physical barrier to stop sediment transport in the direction of longshore drift (also called longshore transport). If a groyne is correctly designed, then the amount of material it can hold will be limited, and excess sediment will be free to move on through the system. However, if a groyne is too large it may trap too much sediment, which can cause severe beach erosion on the down-drift side.

=== Groyne fields ===
Groynes are generally placed in series, generally all perpendicular to the shore. The areas between groups of groynes are groyne fields.

=== Terminal groyne syndrome ===
A poorly designed groyne (too long and not suited to the unique features of the coast) can also accelerate the erosion of the downdrift beach, which receives little or no sand from longshore drift. This process is known as terminal groyne syndrome, because in a series of groynes it occurs after the terminal groyne (last groyne on the downdrift side of the beach or coastline).

=== Headland groyne / Headland breakwater ===
A breakwater is an artificial offshore structure built parallel to the shore -- similar to naturally formed barrier islands -- that normally remains unattached to the shore. When a groyne is built to attach the breakwater to the shore, it is called a "headland groyne", also known as "bulkhead groyne", "headland breakwater", "T-head groyne", or "T-shaped groyne".

== Usage ==
=== Coastal management ===
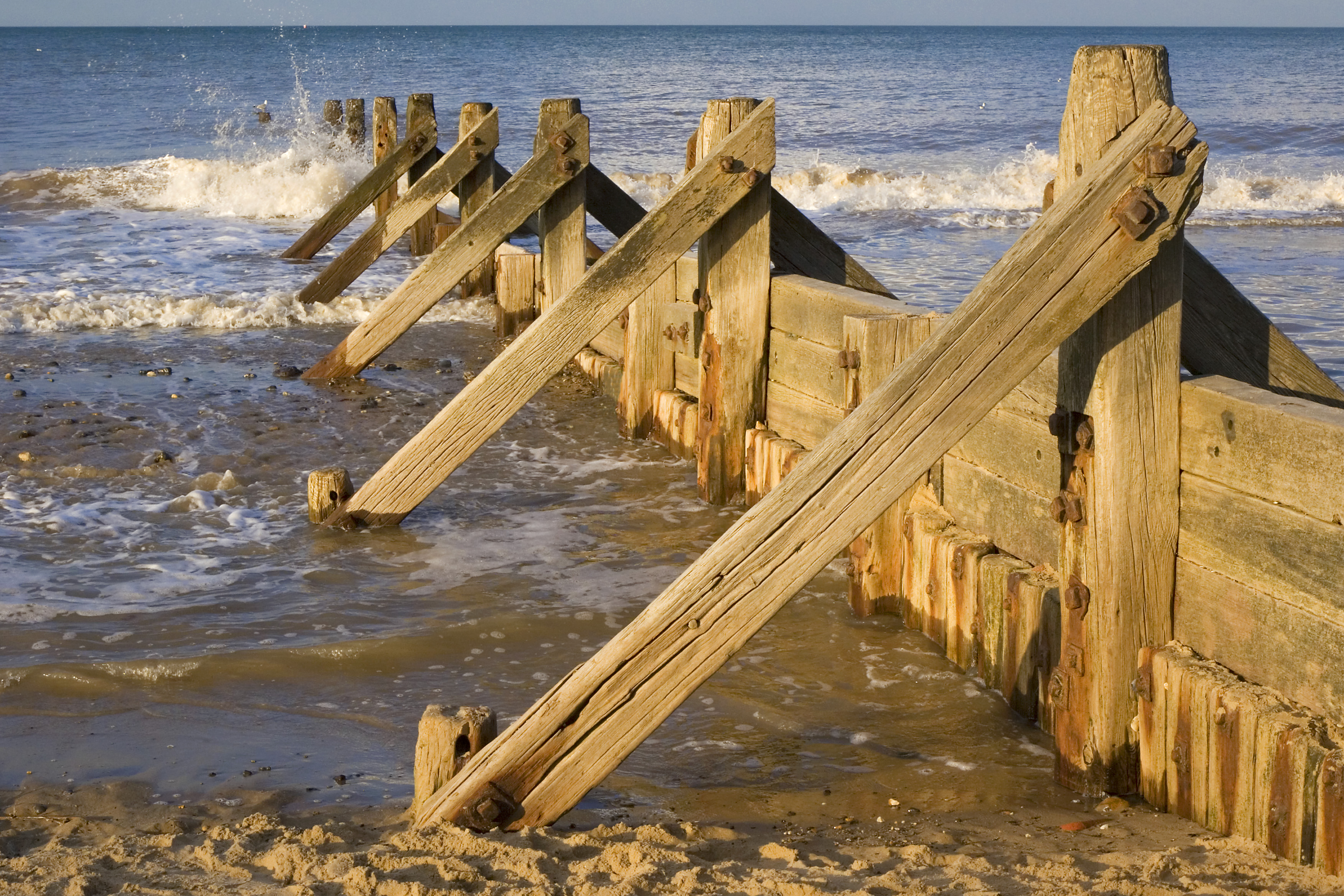
Wooden groyne, Mundesley, UK

A groyne's length and elevation, and the spacing between groynes is determined according to local wave energy and beach slope. Groynes that are too long or too high tend to accelerate downdrift erosion, and are ineffective because they trap too much sediment. Groynes that are too short, too low, or too permeable are ineffective because they trap too little sediment. If a groyne does not extend far enough landward, water (for example at a high tide combined with a storm surge) may flow past the landward end and erode a channel bypassing the groyne, a process known as flanking.

=== River management ===
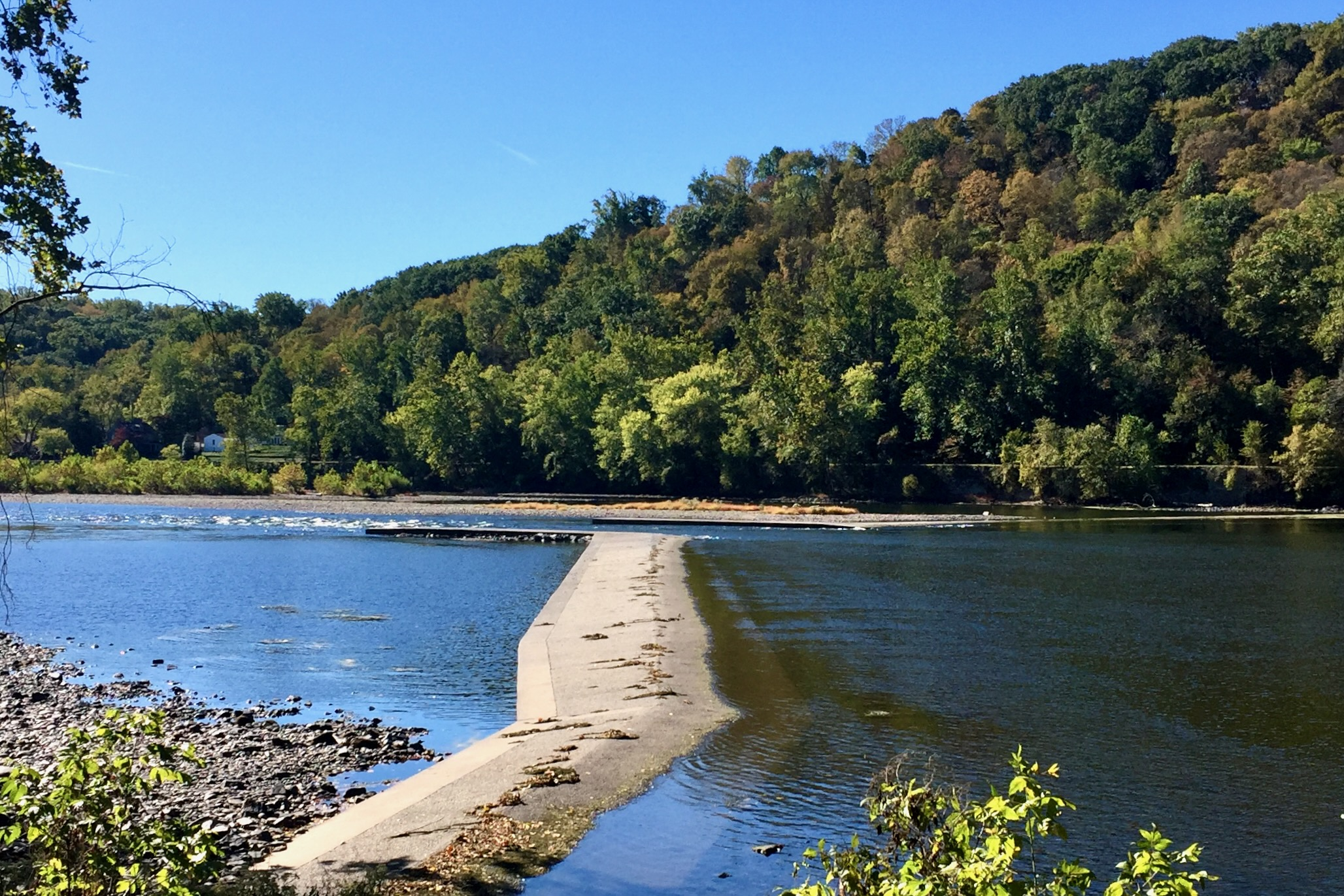
Lumberville Wing Dam on the Delaware River at Bulls Island, New Jersey. Some water is pouring over the wing dams or groins; there is a navigation channel between them.

River groynes (spur dykes, wing dykes, or wing dams) are often constructed nearly perpendicular to the riverbanks, beginning at a riverbank with a root and ending at the regulation line with a head. They maintain a channel to prevent ice jamming, and more generally improve navigation and control over lateral erosion, that would form from meanders. Groynes have a major impact on the river morphology: they cause autonomous degradation of the river.

They are also used around bridges to prevent bridge scour.

== Types ==
Submerged groin (US spelling), Hunting Island, South Carolina

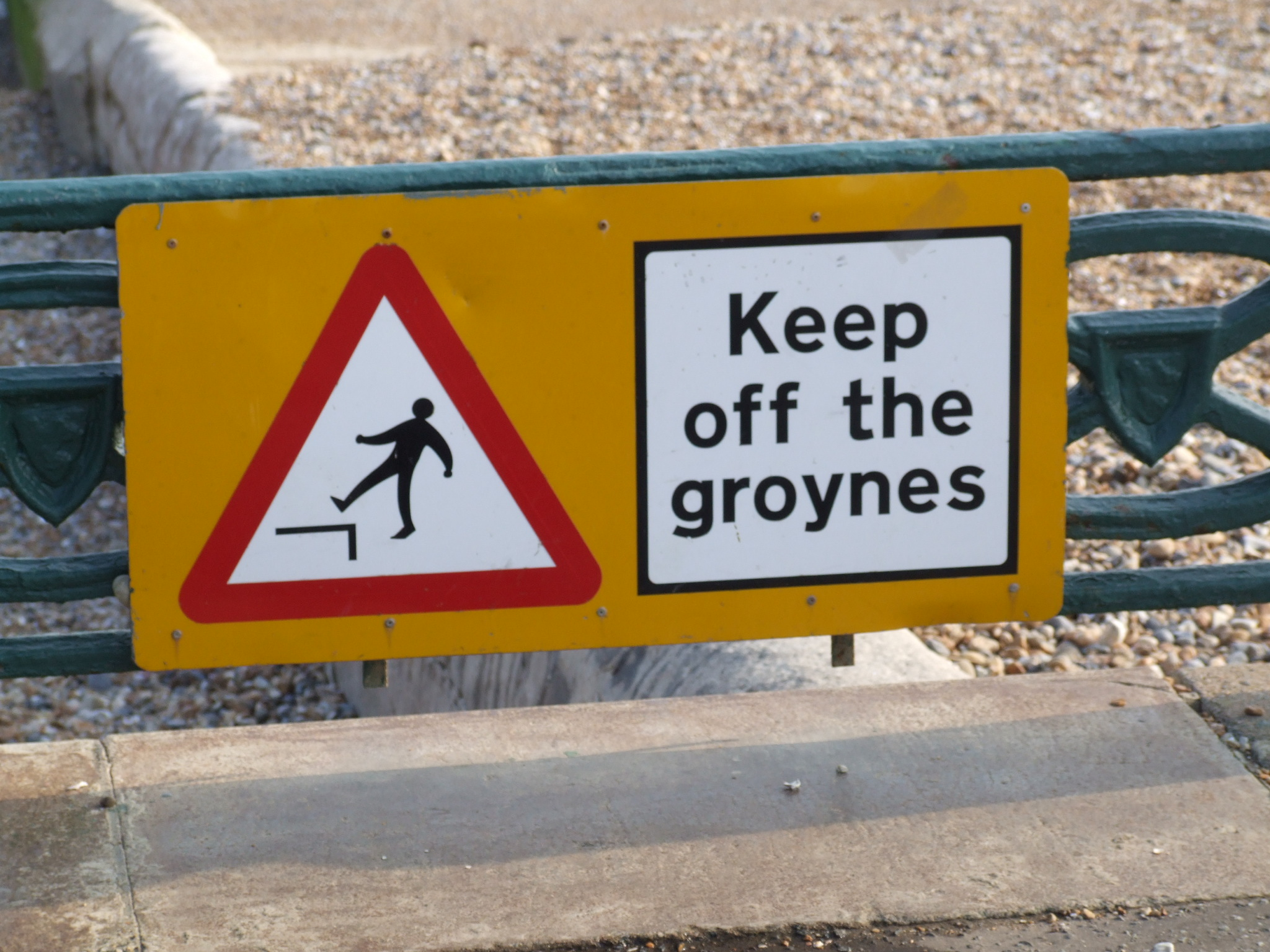
A "Keep off the groynes" sign in Brighton, England, with a groyne showing in the background.

Groynes can be distinguished by how they are constructed, whether they are submerged, their effect on stream flow or by shape.

=== By their planview shape ===
Groynes can be built with different planview shapes. Some examples include straight groynes, hockey stick or curved, inverted hockey stick groynes, tail or checkmark shaped groynes, L head, straight groynes with pier head (seaward end raised on the stilts, since the pier head is raised on the stilts it does not act as the breakwater), T-head (headland groyne, breakwater attached to the shore with straight groyne, the head/breakwater itself could be shaped straight, Y-shaped, arrow or wing shaped head).

=== By cross-section based on material used ===
Wooden groynes, sheetpile groynes, sandbag groynes, rubble mound or gabion groynes, etc.

=== By permeability ===
Groynes can be permeable, allowing the water to flow through at reduced velocities, or impermeable, blocking and deflecting the current.

- Permeable groynes are large rocks, bamboo or timber
- impermeable groynes (solid groynes or rock armour groynes) are constructed using rock, gravel, gabions.

=== By whether they are submerged ===
Groynes can be submerged or not under normal conditions. Usually impermeable groynes are non-submerged, since flow over the top of solid groynes may cause severe erosion along the shanks. Submerged groynes, on the other hand, may be permeable depending on the degree of flow disturbance needed.

=== By their effect on stream flow ===
Groynes can be attracting, deflecting or repelling.

- Attracting groynes point downstream, serving to attract the stream flow toward themselves and not repel the flow toward the opposite bank. They tend to maintain deep current close to the bank.
- Deflecting groynes change the direction of flow without repelling it. They are generally short and used for limited, local protection.
- Repelling groynes point upstream; they force the flow away from themselves. A single groyne may have one section, for example, attracting, and another section deflecting.

== Gallery ==
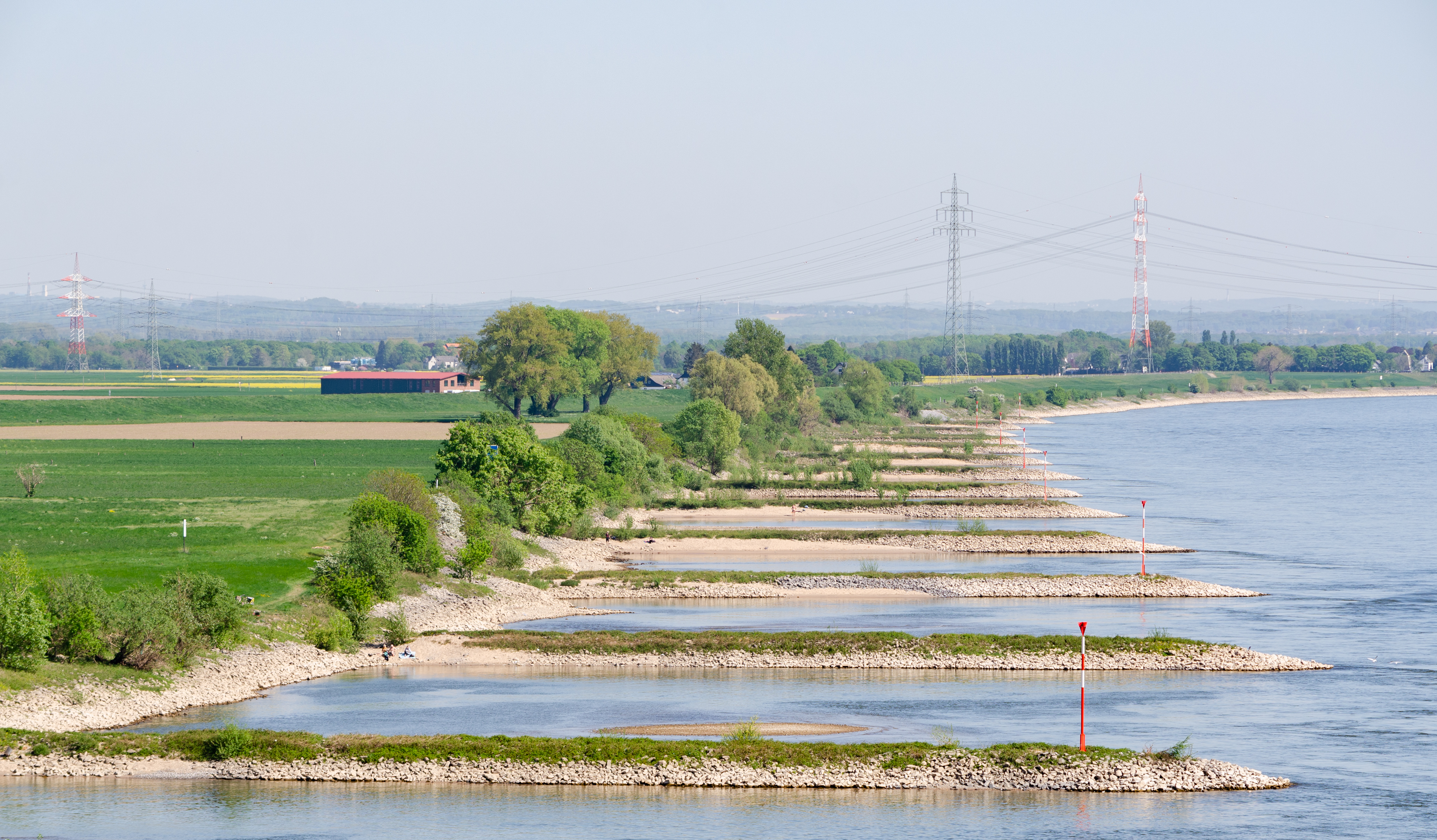
Groynes on the Rhine, Germany

Groynes in the Waal, part of the Rhine in the Netherlands

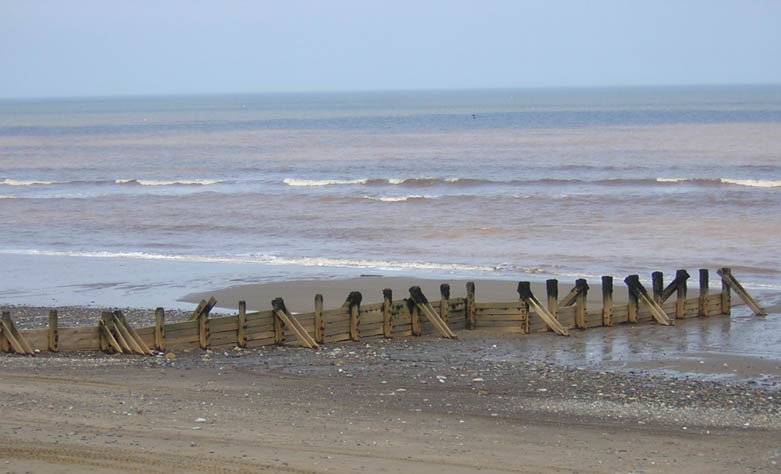
Groyne on the east coast of England

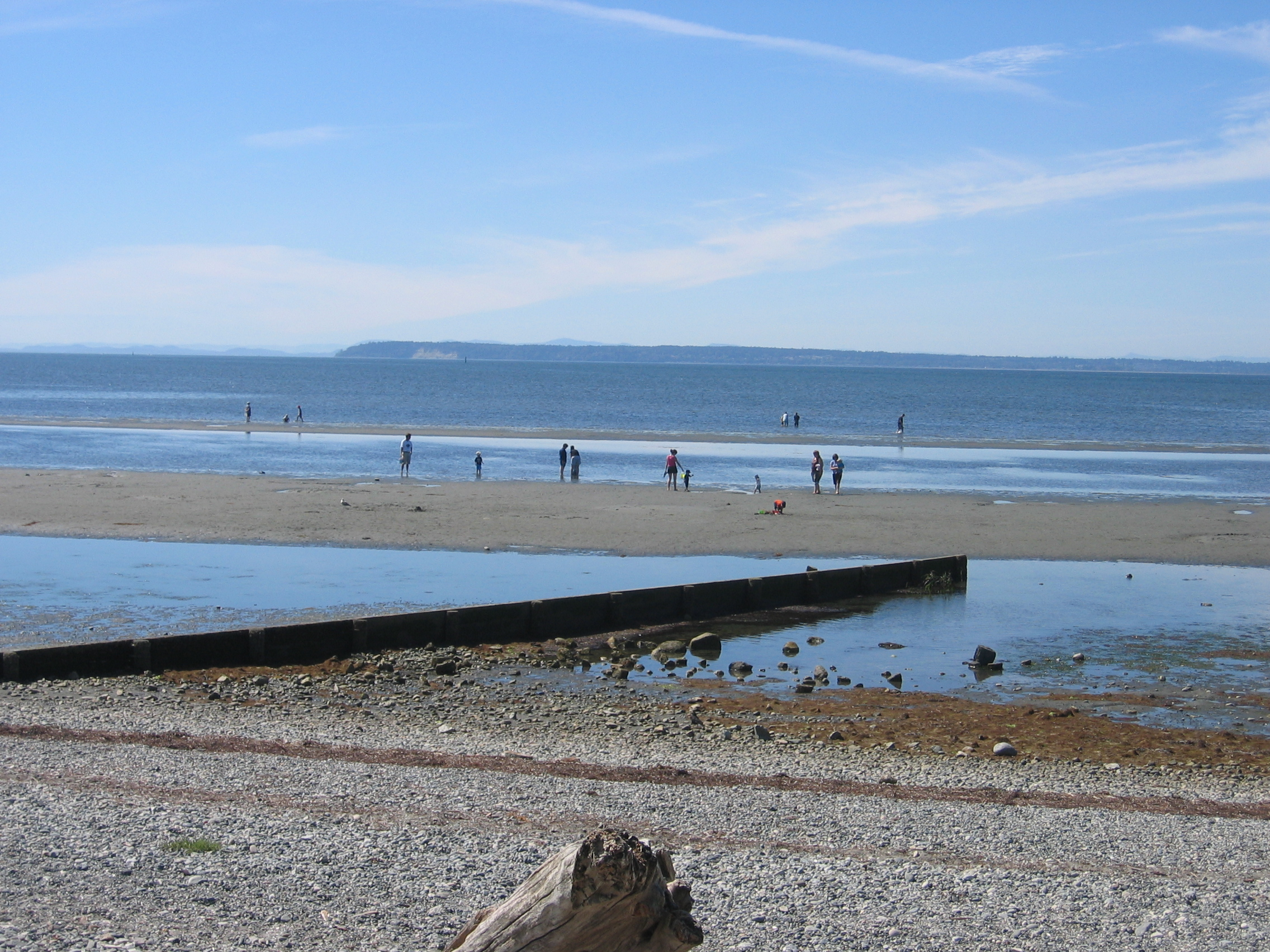
Groyne in Crescent Beach, British Columbia, Canada

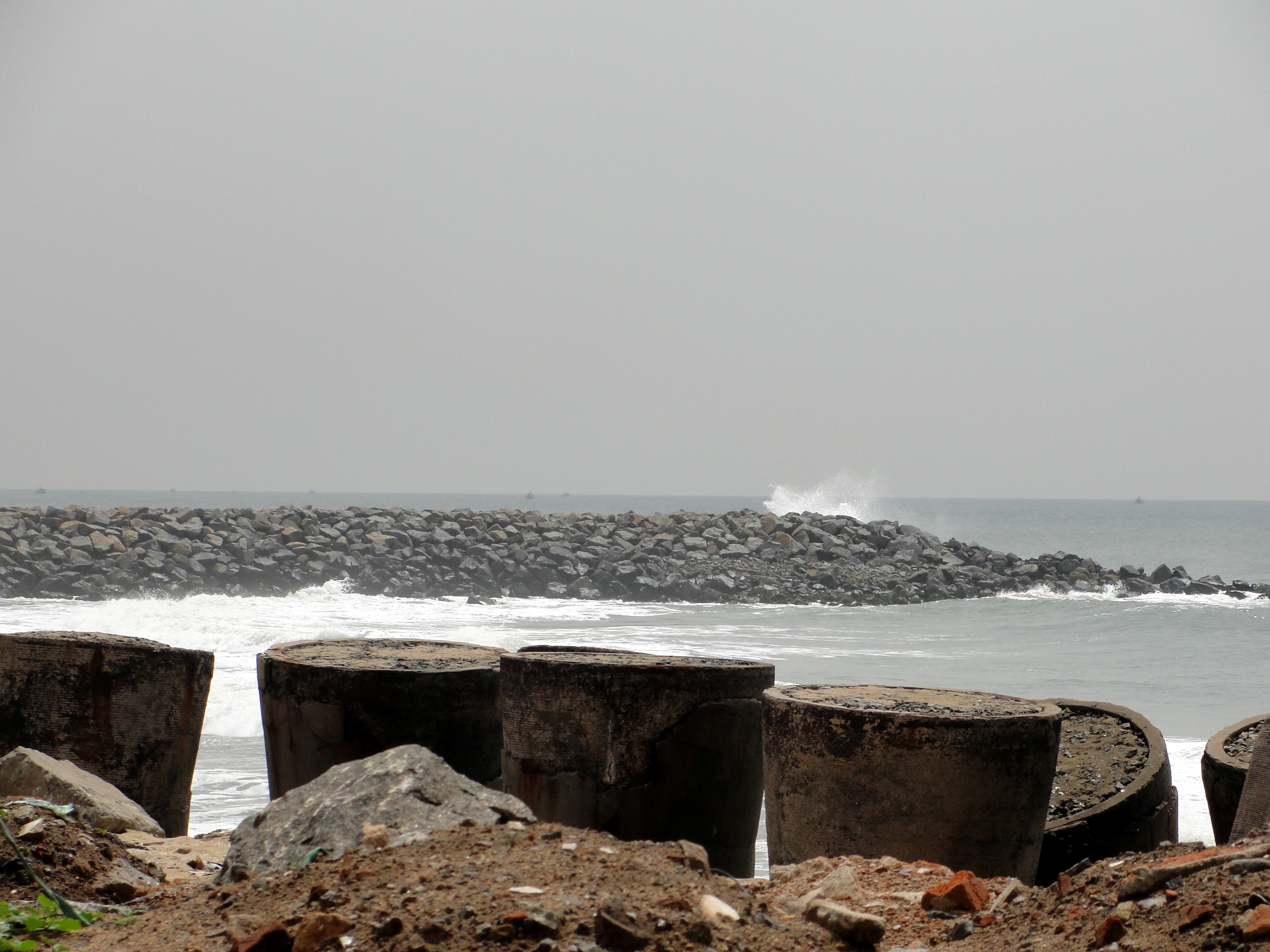
Groynes off the Ennore Expressway near Chennai, India

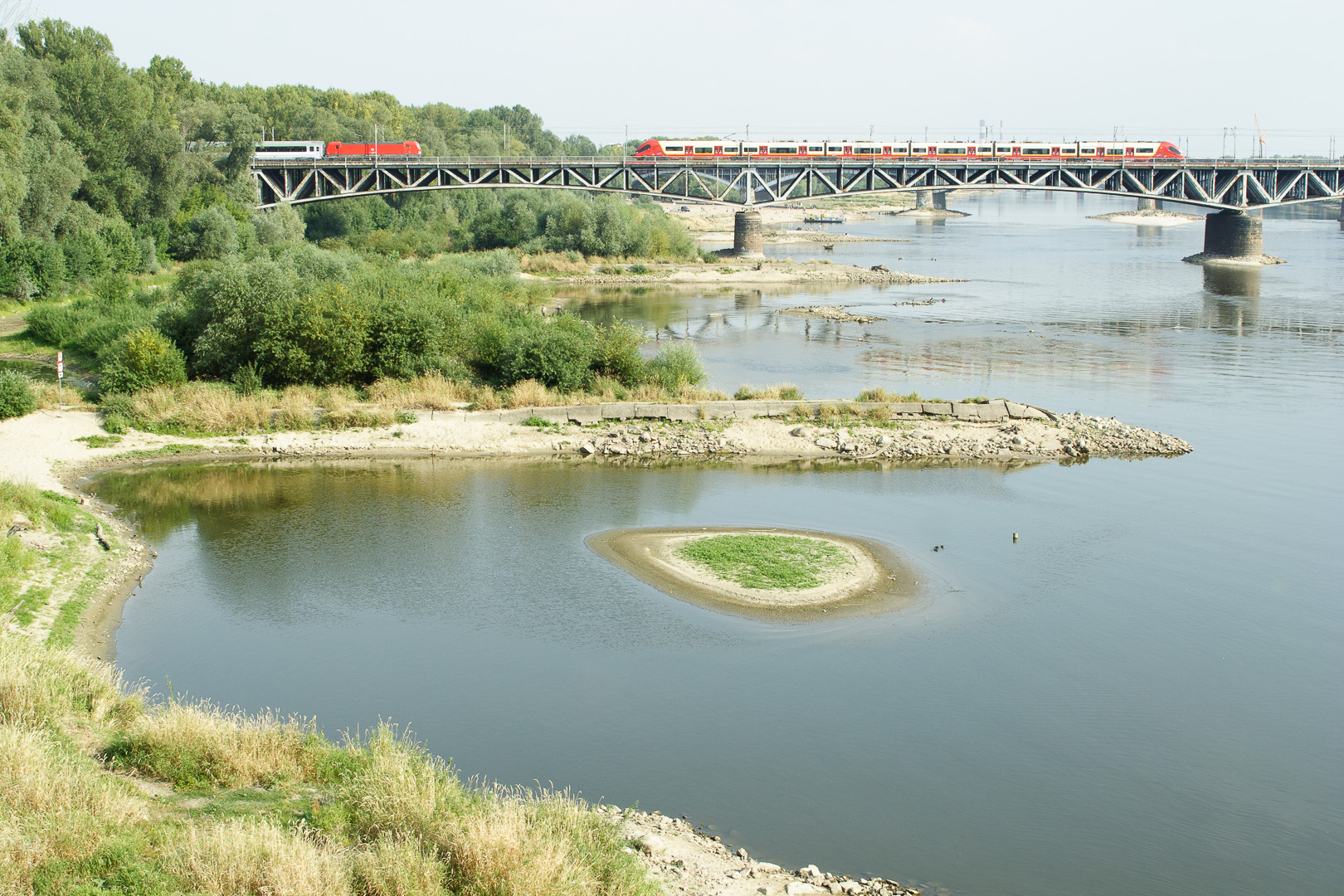
Groynes on the Vistula, Warsaw, Poland

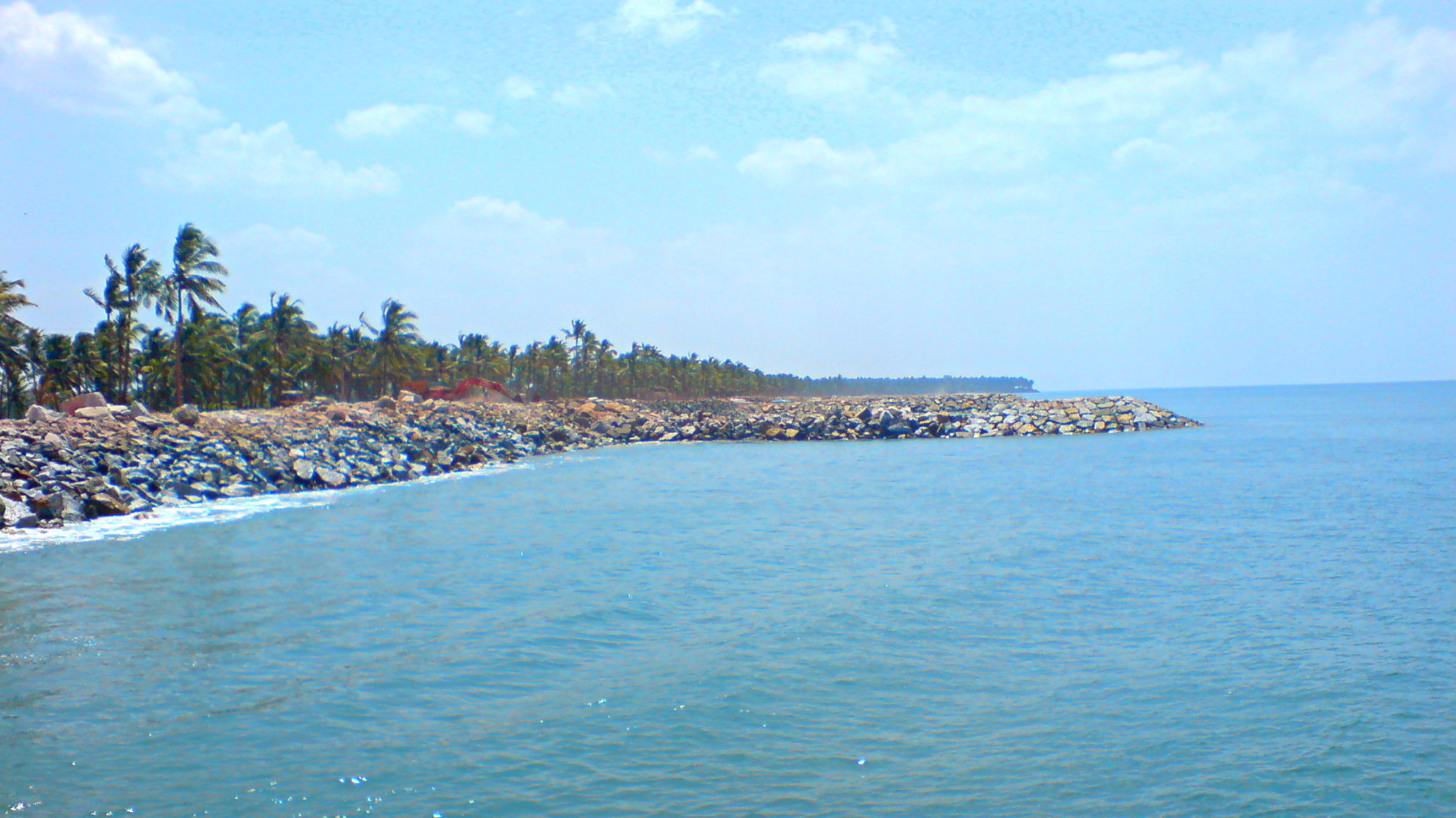
Groynes on the Arabian Sea at Pozhikara on the Malabar Coast of India

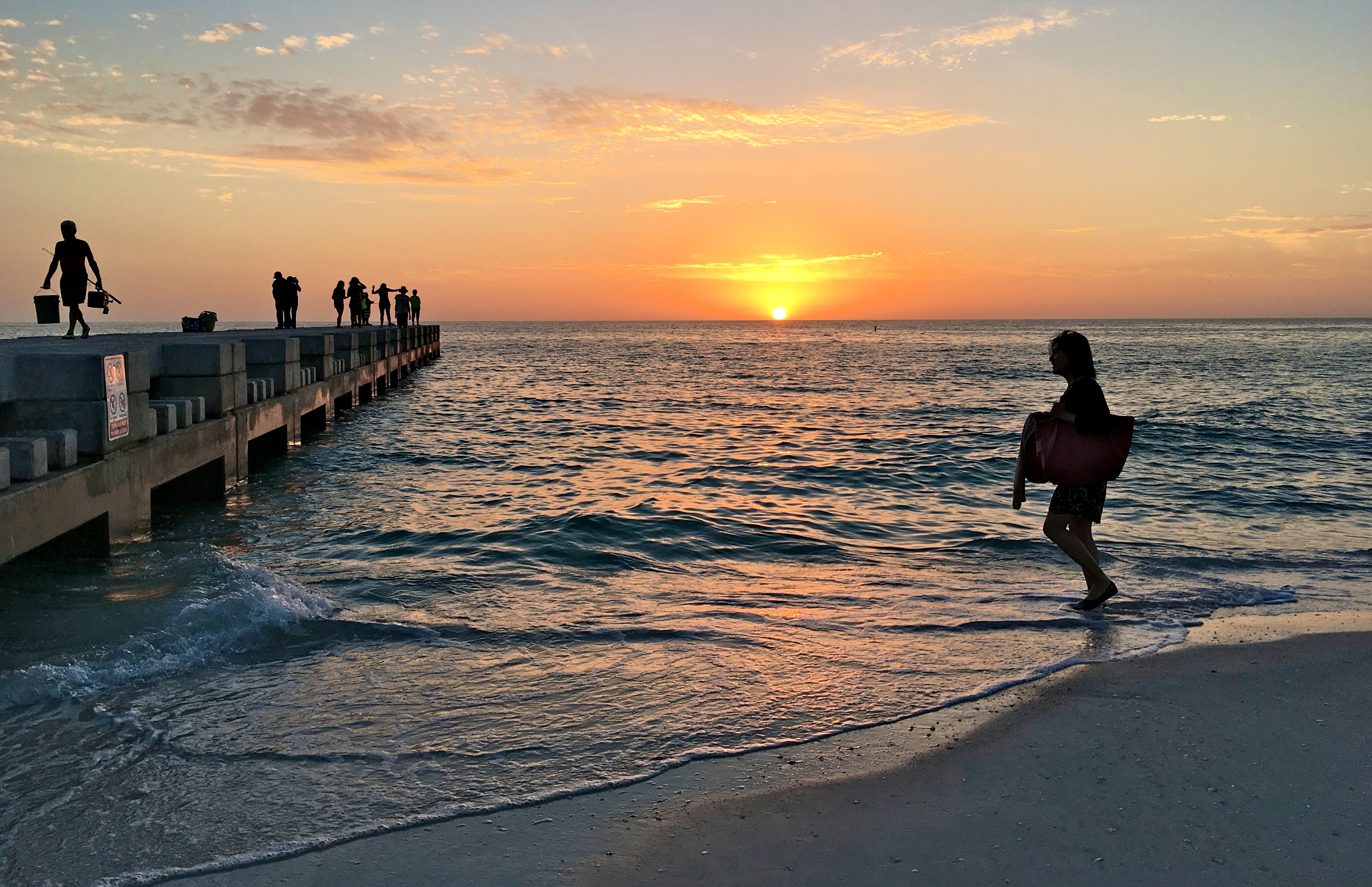
A groyne at Cortez Beach on Anna Maria Island, Florida at sunset

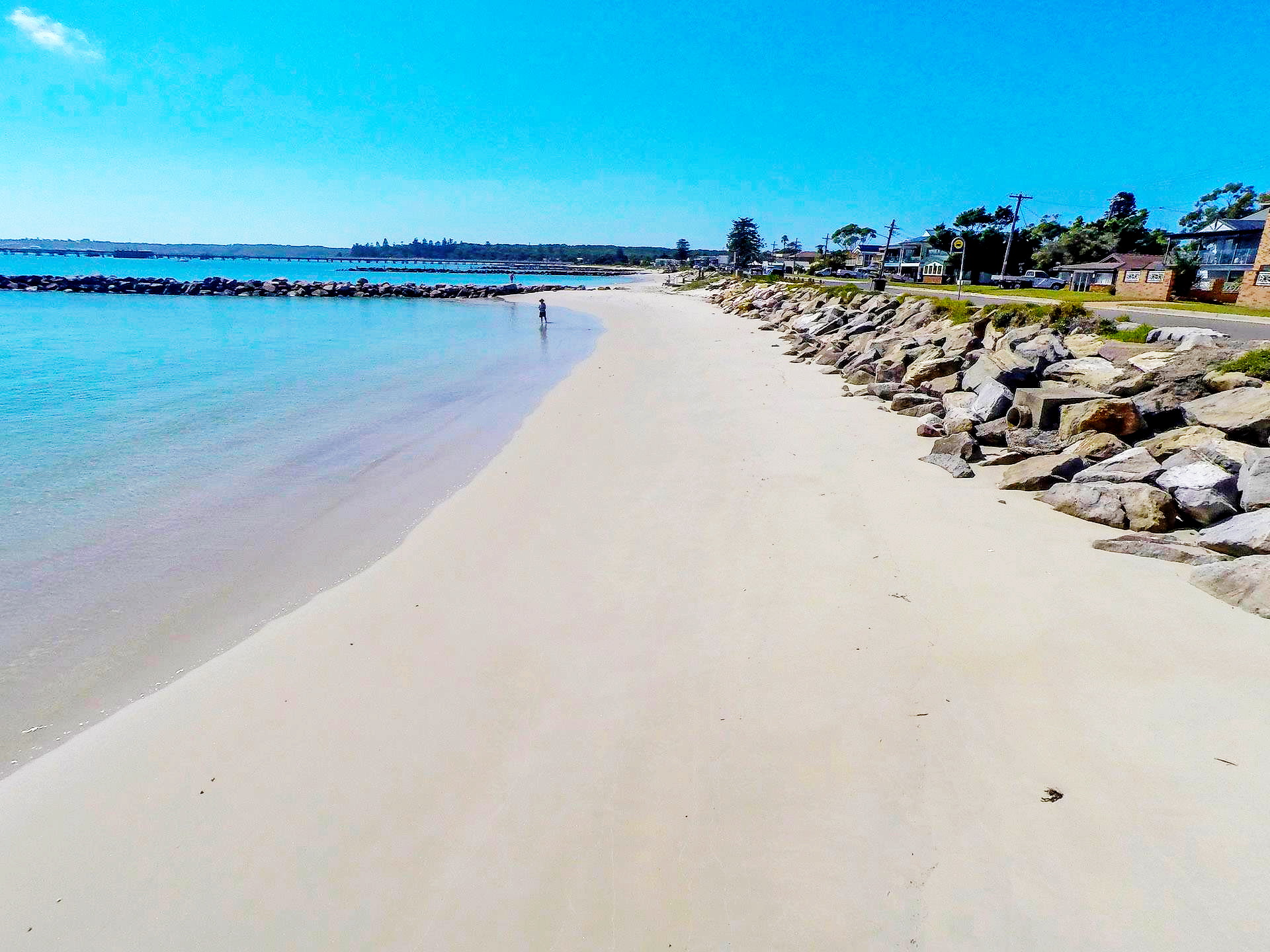
Groyne at Silver Beach, Sydney, Australia

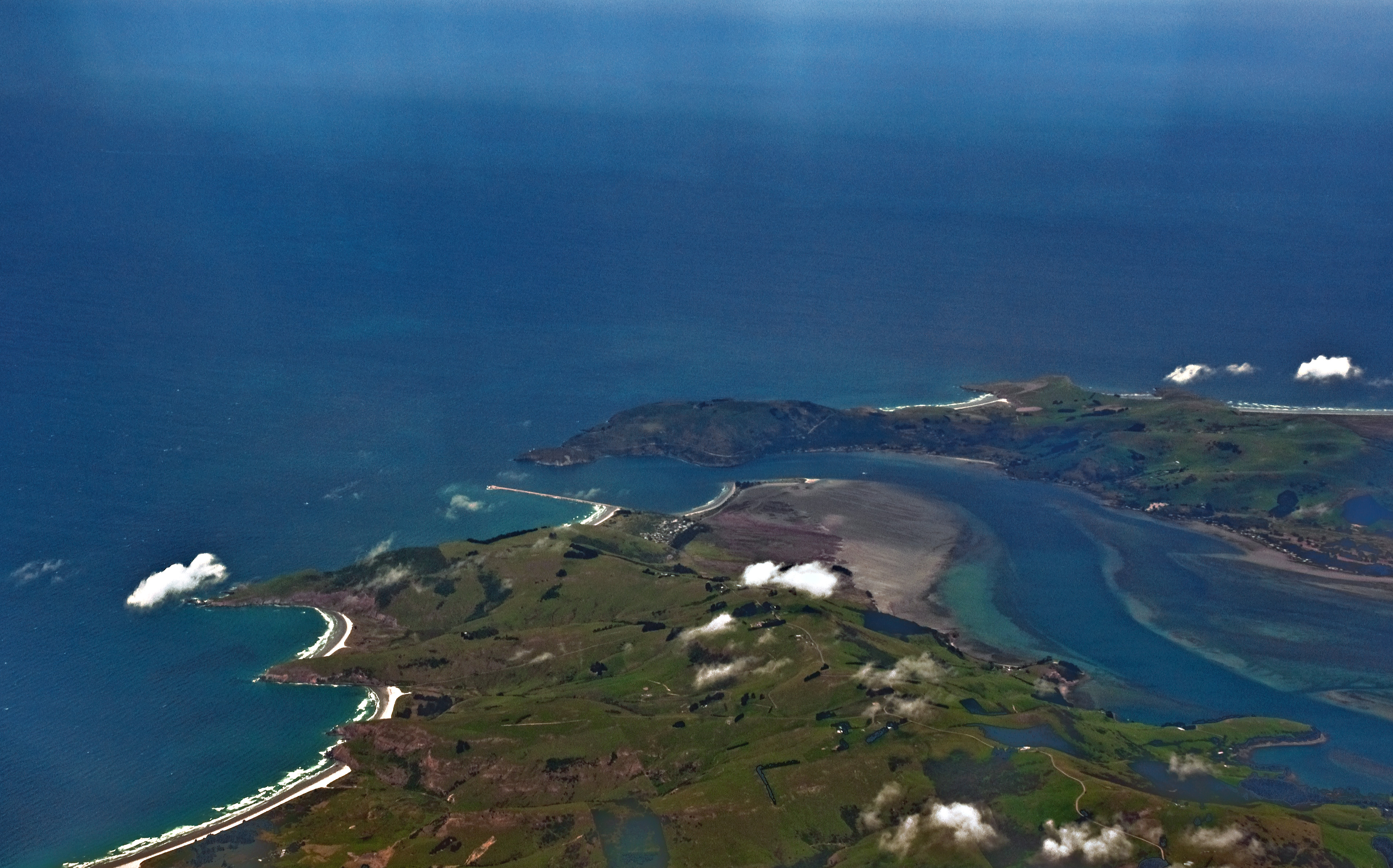
A 1200-metre-long mole at Aramoana (centre left of image), protects the mouth of New Zealand's Otago Harbour

== See also ==
- Similar
  - Dolos, a wave-dissipating concrete block for coastal management
  - Training (civil)
  - Breakwater
  - Drop structure
  - Jetty
- Beach erosion and accretion
  - Beach nourishment
  - Modern recession of beaches
  - Raised beach
  - Strand plain
- Integrated coastal zone management
  - Coastal management, to prevent coastal erosion and creation of beach
  - Coastal and oceanic landforms
  - Coastal development hazards
  - Coastal erosion
  - Coastal geography
  - Coastal engineering
  - Coastal morphodynamics
  - Coastal and Estuarine Research Federation (CERF)
- Erosion
  - Bioerosion
  - Blowhole
  - Natural arch
  - Wave-cut platform
- Longshore drift
  - Deposition (sediment)
  - Coastal sediment supply
  - Sand dune stabilization
  - Submersion

== Notes ==
- Construction Industry Research and Information Association (1990) Groynes in coastal engineering : data on performance of existing groyne systems, CIRIA technical note 135, London : CIRIA, ISBN 0-86017-314-3
- Crossman, M. and Simm, J. (2004) Manual on the use of timber in coastal and river engineering, HR Wallingford, London : Thomas Telford, ISBN 0-7277-3283-8
- French, P.W. (2001) Coastal defences : processes, problems and solutions, London : Routledge, ISBN 0-415-19844-5
- Hoyle, J.W. and King, J.T. (1971) The principles of coast protection, Lyndhurst : the authors, ISBN 0-903015-00-5
- Przedwojski, B., Błażejewski, R and Pilarczyk, K.W. (1995) River training techniques : fundamentals, design and applications, Rotterdam : Balkema, ISBN 90-5410-196-2
- Walker, D.J. (1987) Nearshore hydrodynamics and the behaviour of groynes on sandy beaches, PhD thesis, Imperial College London, 277 p.
- Yossef, M.F.M. (2005). Morphodynamics of rivers with groynes (Thesis). Delft University Press. ISBN 90-407-2607-8. Also published in the Delft Hydraulics Select Series (No. 7/2005).
