= Bulimba Creek =

Bulimba Creek Doboy Creek, Doughboy Creek
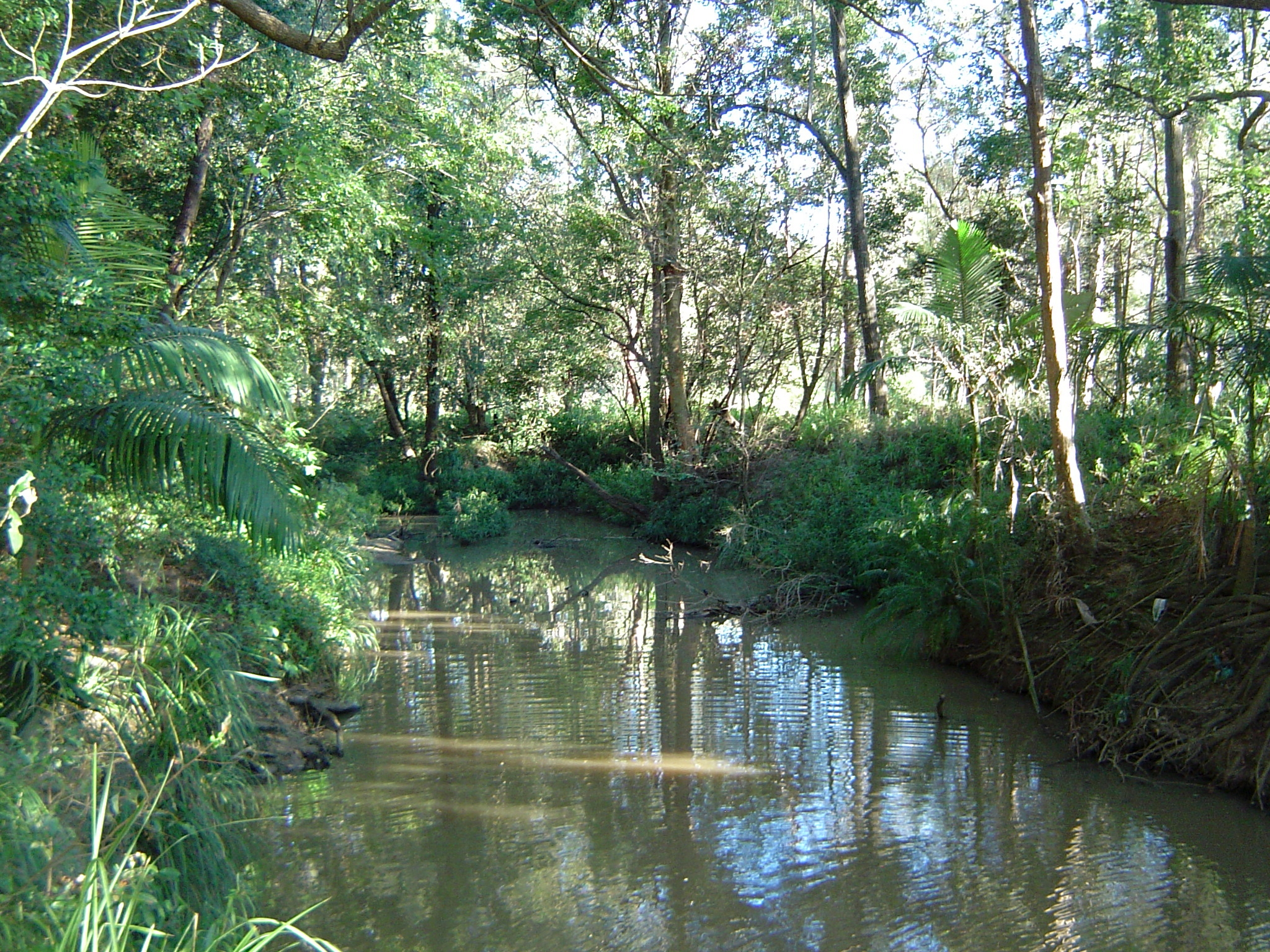
- Bulimba Creek at Mansfield, 2014

- Location of the Bulimba Creek mouth in Queensland
- Etymology: Aboriginal: Boolimbah meaning a place of the magpie-lark

Location
- Country: Australia
- State: Queensland
- Region: South East Queenseland
- City: Brisbane

Physical characteristics
- Source: Mount Gravatt via Bulimba Creek West
  - location: Kuraby
  - coordinates: 27°32′48″S 153°4′20″E
- 2nd source: Bulimba Creek East
  - location: Runcorn
  - coordinates: 27°36′30″S 153°3′50″E
- Source confluence: East and West branches
  - location: Eight Mile Plains
  - coordinates: 27°34′23″S 153°4′37″E
- Mouth: confluence with the Brisbane River
  - location: East Brisbane
  - coordinates: 27°25′46″S 153°7′46″E
  - elevation: 0 m (0 ft)
- Basin size: 122 km^{2} (47 sq mi)

Basin features
- River system: Brisbane River

Bulimba Creek, originally known as Doboy Creek or Doughboy Creek, is a perennial stream that is a tributary of the Brisbane River, located in suburban Brisbane in the South East region of Queensland, Australia.

== Course and features ==
The Bulimba Creek catchment has it sources in the low plateaus and marshy parts of the suburbs of Sunnybank and Runcorn (west catchment) and Kuraby (east catchment) in the south of Brisbane. It then flows in a northerly direction through the suburbs of Mansfield, Mackenzie, Carindale, Murarrie and Lytton, before meeting the Brisbane River via the Aquarium Passage along the Lytton Reach. The creek has six tributaries: Mimosa Creek, Spring Creek, Salvin Creek, Phillips Creek, Tingalpa Creek and Lindum Creek. There are also a number of significant wetlands systems in the catchment, including Runcorn Wetlands in the upper catchment and Numgubbah, Tingalpa, Doboy and Lindum Wetlands in the lower catchment.

The creek is currently impacted primarily by urban and industrial development. In the past the creek corridor was extensively cleared for cropping and then grazing in the early part of the last century with some remnant vegetation remaining. In some areas the reduction in rural industries has allowed riparian vegetation to regrow.

The catchment has a nature reserve network, mainly of protected hills, including Karawatha Forest, Toohey Forest Conservation Park and Mt Gravatt Outlook, Belmont Hills, Whites Hill and Pine Mountain, Seven Hills and Oates Hill. The creek feeds the Runcorn Water Reserve, Tingalpa Wetlands, Nungubba Swamp, Dairy Swamp, Lyndon Wetlands, Iona Wetlands, The Bulimba Creek Oxbow and Minnippi Parklands.

== Fauna and flora ==
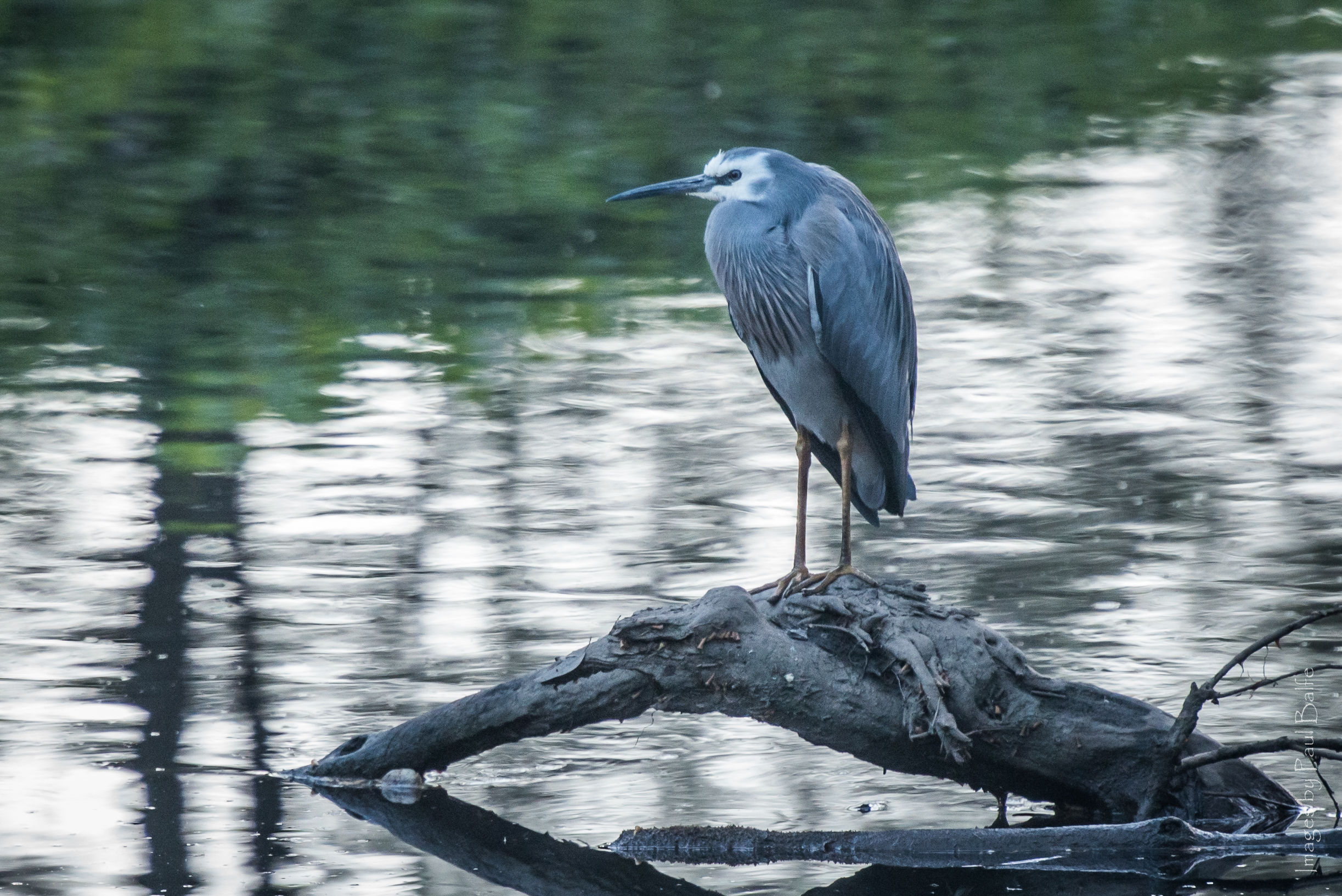
White-faced heron

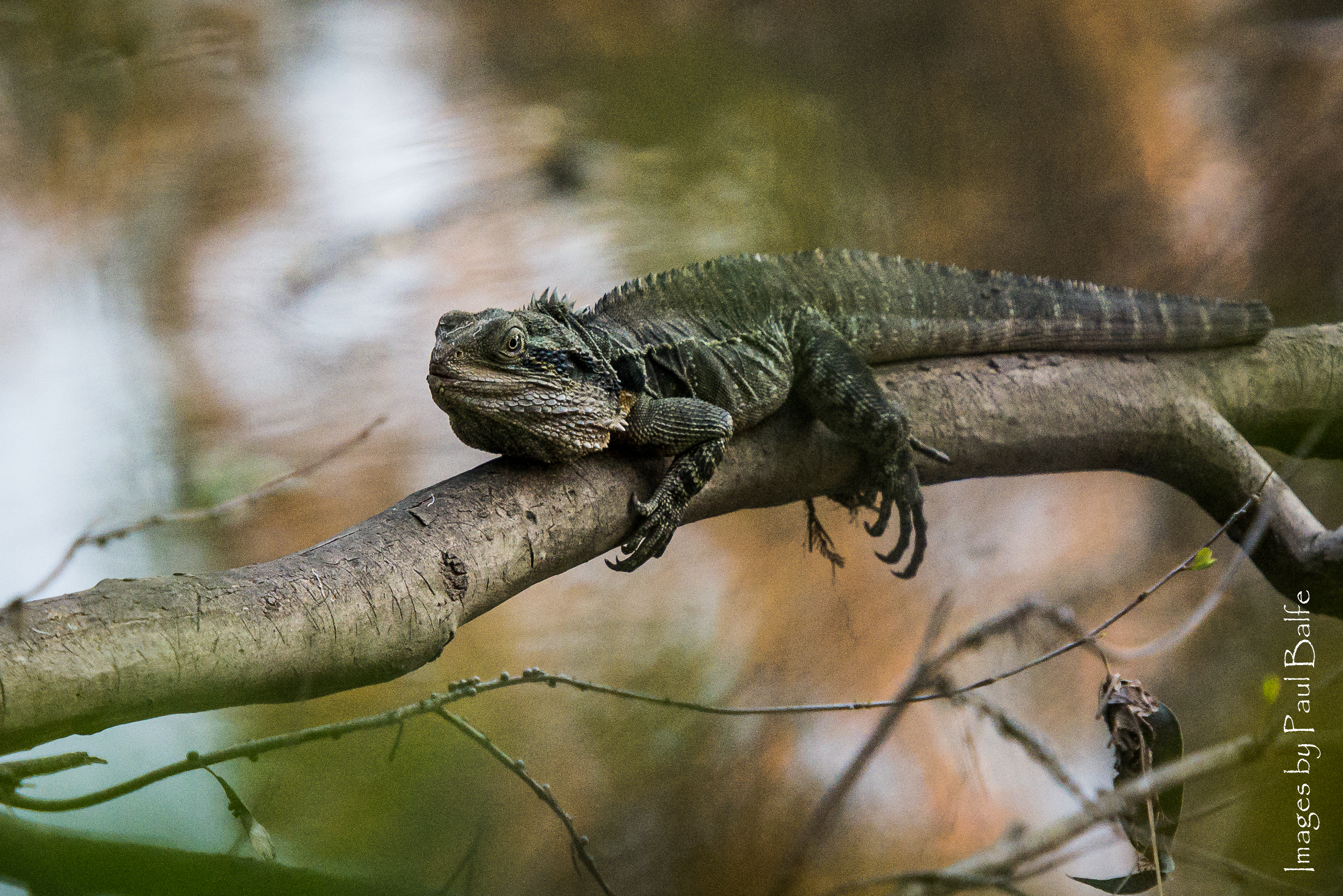
Eastern water dragon

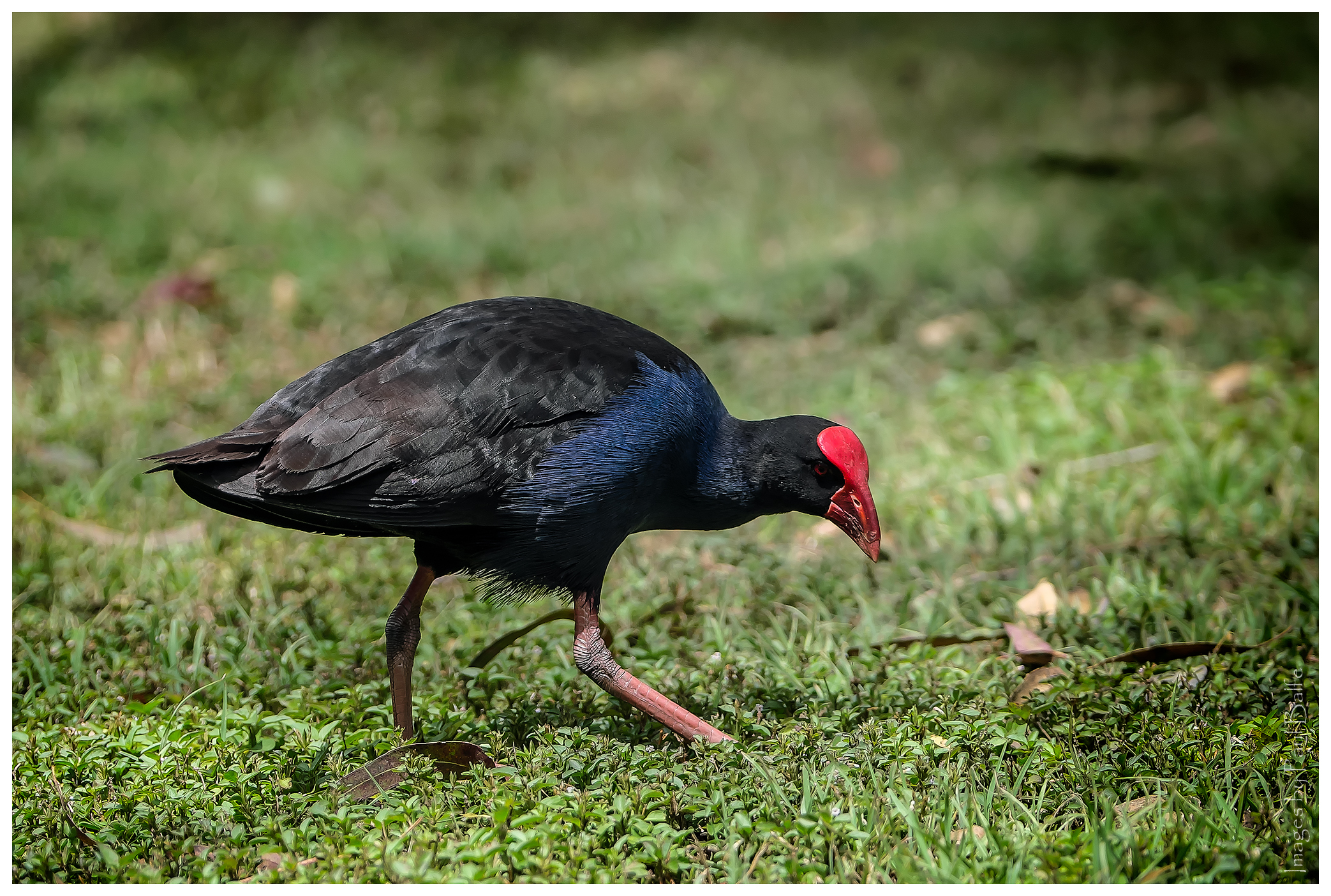
Australasian swamphen

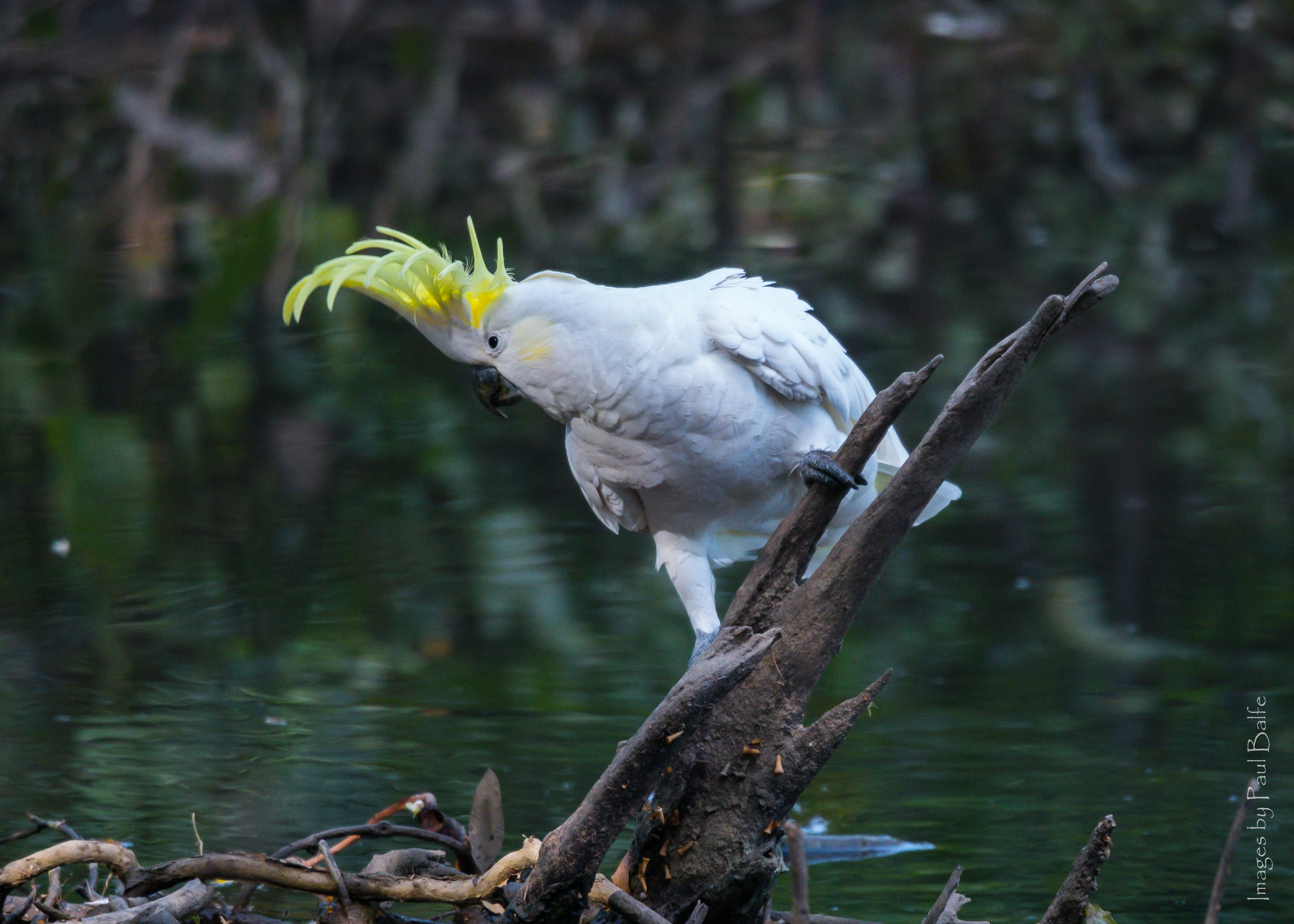
Greater sulphur-crested cockatoo

Some native wildlife photographed at Bulimba Creek

The Bulimba Creek catchment supports abundant native fauna and flora including several vulnerable species. The water mouse (Xeromys myoides) is particularly vulnerable in the area and is a protected species. The wetlands support a large number of dragonfly (Odonata) species including some rare ones that are locally threatened. At Whites Hill the powerful owl, grey-headed flying fox, velvet gecko and grey goshawk are all locally threatened. Flora at risk includes Shirley's tuckeroo (Cupaniopsis shirleyana) and Macadamia integrifolia.

The most common native marine species in the lower reaches sleepy cod (Oxyeleotris lineolata), flathead gudgeon (Philypnodon grandiceps), dwarf flathead gudgeon (Philypnodon macrostomus), sea mullet (Mugil cephalus), bream (Acanthopagrus australis), catfish (Neoarius graeffei), dewfish (Tandanus tandanus) and Speckled longfin eel (Anguilla reinhardtii). Bull sharks have been observed in the lower reaches.

In the upper reaches, smaller species can be found including are Australian freshwater prawns (Macrobrachium australiense), checkered rainbowfish (Melanotaenia splendida inornata) southern shortfin eel (Anguilla australis), purple-spotted gudgeon (Mogurnda adspersa). Other semi-aquatic species found regularly using the waterway include the eastern water dragon, rakali, water mouse, a variety of amphibians including native frogs and toads including Stony-creek Frog (Litoria wilcoxii), Striped Rocketfrog (Litoria nasuta), Graceful Treefrog (Litoria gracilenta) Ornate Burrowing Frog (Platyplectrum ornatum), Striped Marsh Frog (Limnodynastes peronii), Tusked Frog (Adelotus brevis) Australian green tree frog and short-necked turtle noted..

The wetlands are home to many common waterbirds and woodland birds, including Australasian swamphens, Australian white ibis, sacred kingfishers, Australian magpies, Australian ravens, brush turkey, sulphur-crested cockatoo, kookaburra, musk lorikeet (Glossopsitta concinna), dollarbird, leaden flycatcher, magpie-lark, eastern yellow robin, great cormorant, white-faced heron, figbird, hardhead, Australian wood duck, pale-vented bush-hen, black swan, black-faced cuckooshrike, crested pigeon, superb fairy wren, Australian rufous fantail, whistling kite, noisy miner, Bush Stone-curlew (Burhinus grallarius), tawny frogmouths and Lewin's honeyeater.

Native vegetation includes many species of tree including mangroves, swamp oak and reeds. More than 400 species of plants have been identified as native to the area. Howeverit contains no threatened or protected plant species.

Populations of other animals along the reaches include several common snake species,koalas, wallabies, brushtail possums, ringtail possums, short-beaked echidna, feathertail gliders and black flying-fox present in places.

Karawatha Forest is the reserve with the highest number of species and has five different species of glider possums. The Compton Road land bridge is a fauna overpass constructed over the four lane road, along with underpasses, rope ladders and exclusion funneling fencing.

=== Invasive species and pests ===
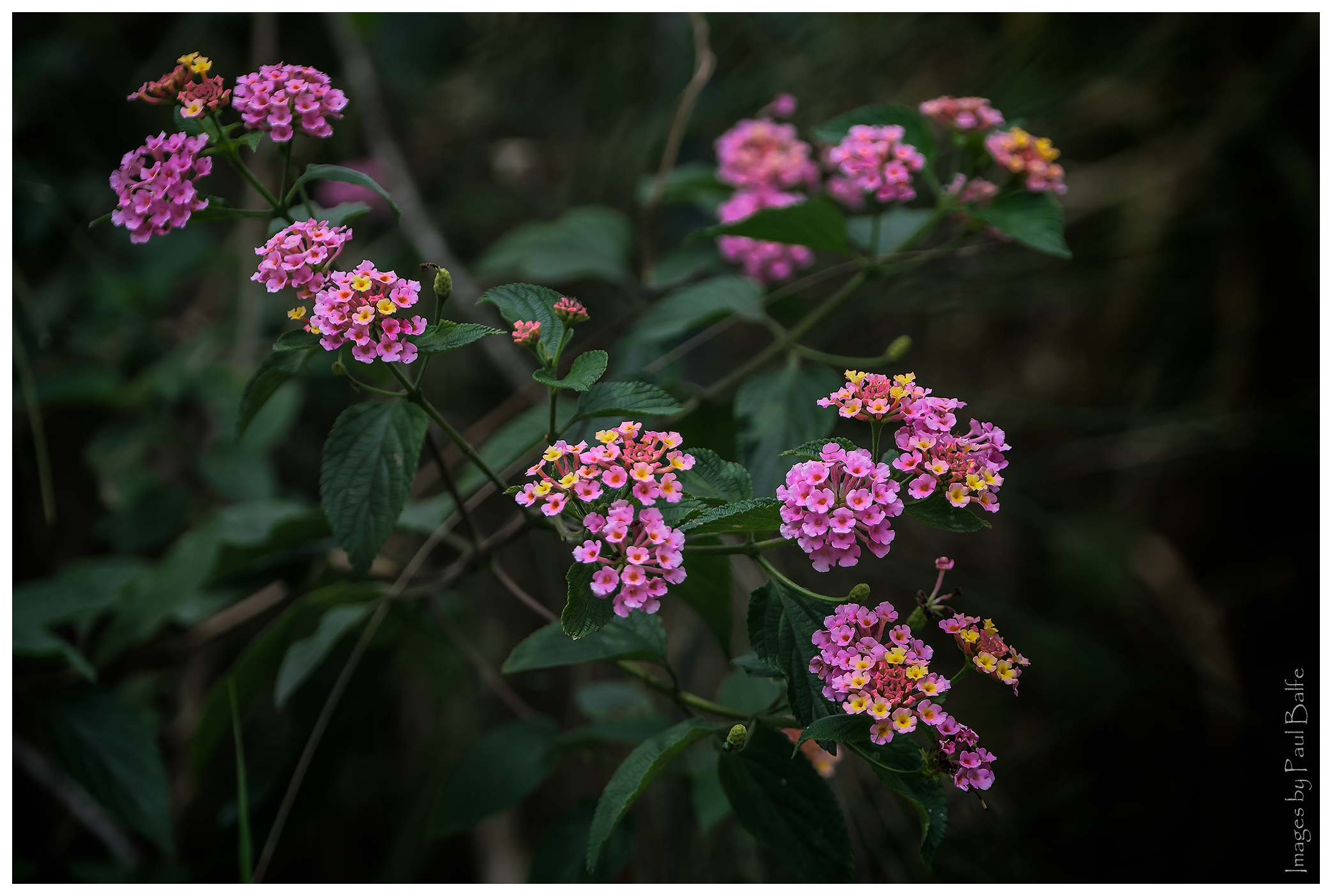
Invasive Lantana camara found along the creek at Carindale

The introduced fish species spotted tilapia and Mozambique tilapia are prevalent in the waterway. These fish threaten local native species through their aggressive breeding and competition.

The creek suffers from the introduction of the waterway weed called salvinia, first identified in the catchment in 1953.

Control programs for common urban pests in the catchment include red foxes, common myna, cat's claw creeper (Dolichandra unguis-cati), Lantana camara and cane toads. The catchment is one of the most affected by infestations of the red imported fire ant, with parts of being declared treatment areas and restricted zones with ongoing management being part of the National Fire Ant Eradication Program.

== Recreational use ==
The creek corridor is used for recreation, connecting a large expanse of parks and reserves, the largest of which is Minnippi Parklands which features a wetland lake. Paddle sports are facilitated by a launching ramp at Minnippi Parklands in Carina and the Bulimba Creek Canoe Trail is a popular route for paddlers. Fishing is popular along its reaches and is facilitated by a fishing platform at Carmichael Park. Cycling is also popular with the Bulimba Creek Bikeway running most of the creek's course and connects other bikeways along its tributaries and the Brisbane International Cycle Park, Murarrie Recreation Reserve is nearby. Walking and running is also popular along the creek with three weekly parkrun courses at Minnippi parkrun (Carina), Mansfield parkrun (Mansfield), and Wishart parkrun (Wishart) all feature course stretches alongside the creek bank. Birdwatching is popular near the creek at Minnipi and. Other recreational uses nearby include golf at Minnippi Golf & Range and at Meadowlands there is a drone and model aircraft launching zone.

== History ==
The Indigenous clans of the Yuggera and Turrbal people lived in or traversed parts of the Bulimba Creek catchment for at least twenty thousand years. It is believed that a locality on the creek was called boolimbah, meaning a place of the magpie-lark and thought to refer specifically to what is now known as Whites Hill. The first recorded use of the name Bulimba Creek occurred in 1888.

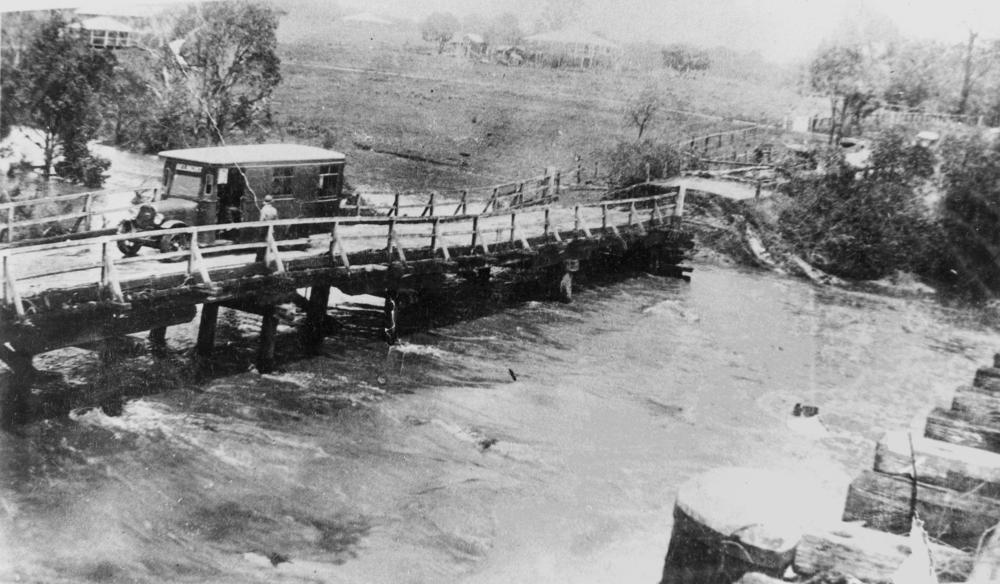
Bulimba Creek at Belmont in 1931

In the late 1860s Walrus, a large paddle steamer built at Cleveland, was converted to Australia's first floating distillery with the addition of a steam driven sugar mill on board. Walrus navigated the lower reaches of Bulimba Creek and the Brisbane River before servicing areas along the Nerang, Albert and the Logan Rivers to the south.

To provide a straighter deeper channel in the lower reaches Brisbane River, it was decided in 1889 to relocate the mouths of creeks and eliminate all of islands by a combination of removal by dredging and incorporation as part of the river bank. In the case of Doughboy Creek (now Bulimba Creek) and Gibson Island, it was decided to relocate the creek mouth then at approximately 27.4440°S 153.1096°E (to the west of Gibson Island) to the eastern end of Gibson Island (its current mouth) by closing the original mouth with a training wall diverting the flow of the creek into Aquarium Passage (27.4394°S 153.1256°E), which separated Gibson Island from the southern bank of the Brisbane River. The Doughboy training wall was built from 1900 to June 1902 and was 7,040 feet (2,150 m) long. As a result of the training wall, an isthmus (approximately 104 metres (341 ft) wide as at 2020) formed at the original mouth of the creek permanently connecting Gibson Island to Murarrie.

In August 2008 the Bulimba Creek valley was polluted by a 100,000-litre (22,000 imp gal; 26,000 US gal) oil leak from the 1964-laid Santos-owned Moomba to Brisbane pipeline adjacent to Bulimba Creek at Carindale, requiring the removal of hundreds of truckloads of contaminated soil from the suburb's recreation reserve.

== Bulimba Creek Catchment Coordinating Committee ==
The Bulimba Creek Catchment Coordinating Committee is associated with the Landcare Group and is run by volunteers. Formed in 1997 and incorporated in 1999, it supports smaller groups and individuals involved in bushcare, catchment care, nature conservation and environmental education and awareness.

Known as the B4C, the group is involved in protecting and rehabilitating waterways, corridors, remnant bushlands and wetlands. It was the first urban Queensland group to win a State Landcare award, in 2000. In 2005 the B4C won the prestigious Thiess National Riverprize. Recent successes in protecting the environment by the B4C include securing the Weekes Road, Carindale Bushlands and Oates Hill Reserve from the Queensland Government, saving the Wishart Bushlands from development, saving the Bulimba Creek Oxbow and negotiating a major rehabilitation project to restore this 30-hectare (74-acre) saline wetland.

The B4C has its own foundation "the Bulimba Creek Environment Fund", which provides small grants to members of the community to get involved in environmental issues, education and training. B4C has its own catchment centre and community nursery. It is in the process of developing a 2-hectare (4.9-acre) site together with its corporate partner, Powerlink, into a sustainability centre, including a sustainable home (office), community nursery, with water-wise gardens and through the use of permaculture methods and sustainable technologies.

== See also ==
- Brisbane native plants
- List of rivers of Australia § Queensland
