= Wishart, Queensland =

Wishart
- Suburb
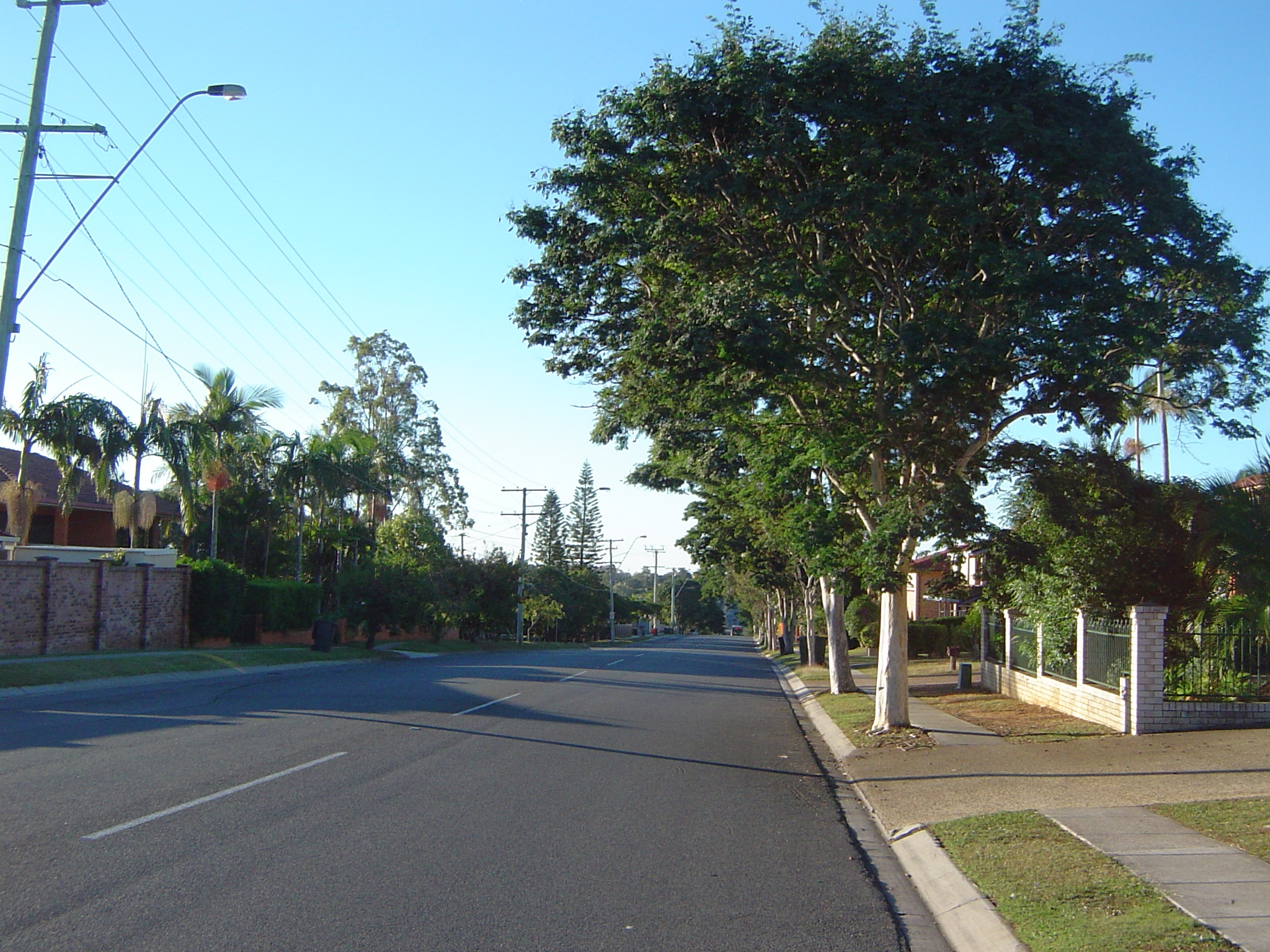
- Ham Road, 2014

- Interactive map of Wishart
- Coordinates: 27.5561°S 153.1027°E
- Country: Australia
- State: Queensland
- City: Brisbane
- LGA: City of Brisbane (MacGregor Ward)
- Location: 15.1 km (9.4 mi) SE of Brisbane CBD
- Established: 1967

Government
  - State electorate: Mansfield
  - Federal division: Bonner

Area
  - Total: 4.3 km^{2} (1.7 sq mi)

Population
  - Total: 11,333 (2021 census)
  - Density: 2,636/km^{2} (6,830/sq mi)
- Time zone: UTC+10:00 (AEST)
- Postcode: 4122
Suburbs around Wishart
Mount Gravatt East	Mansfield	Mackenzie
Upper Mount Gravatt	Wishart	Rochedale
Upper Mount Gravatt	Eight Mile Plains	Rochedale

Wishart is a southern suburb in the City of Brisbane, Queensland, Australia. In the 2021 census, Wishart had a population of 11,333 people.

== Geography ==
Wishart is 15.1 kilometres (9.4 mi) south-east of the Brisbane CBD.

The suburb is bounded to the south and south-east by Bulimba Creek and to the east by the Gateway Motorway.

The Mount Gravatt–Capalaba Road enters the suburb from the west (Upper Mount Gravatt) and exits to the north-east (Mackenzie).

The land use is predominantly suburban residential. There is a strip of parkland and bushland to the immediate west of Bulimba Creek.

== History ==
The suburb was originally named by Queensland Place Names Board 1 August 1967. Name and boundaries confirmed by Minister for Survey and Valuation, Urban and Regional Affairs 11 August 1975. Boundaries altered by the Minister for Natural Resources and Mines, 22 April 2005. The suburb was once known as Mount Gravatt South. It was renamed after the Wishart family who were early settlers in the area.

Newnham Road in Wishart was originally part of a stock route from farming areas south of Brisbane to the Cannon Hill saleyards. The land beside Newnham Road was eventually developed into small farming blocks, reducing the width of the stock route to that of a normal road, but it was still used occasionally by travelling stock until the 1960s. As Brisbane grew the suburb was subdivided for residential blocks.

== Demographics ==
In the 2011 census, the population of Wishart was 10,460 people, 52.4% female and 47.6% male. The median age of the Wishart population was 37 years, the same as the Australian median. 67.6% of people living in Wishart were born in Australia, compared to the national average of 69.8%; the next most common countries of birth were New Zealand 3.9%, England 2.8%, China 1.7%, India 1.6%, South Africa 1.3%. 74.7% of people spoke only English at home; the next most common languages were 3.4% Cantonese, 2.2% Mandarin, 2.2% Greek, 1.3% Hindi, 1.1% Korean.

In the 2016 census, Wishart had a population of 10,700 people.

In the 2021 census, Wishart had a population of 11,333 people.

== Education ==
Wishart State School is a government primary (Prep–6) school for boys and girls at 20 Morella Street (27.5495°S 153.0945°E). In 2018, the school had an enrolment of 756 students with 53 teachers (44 full-time equivalent) and 37 non-teaching staff (22 full-time equivalent). It includes a special education program.

There are no secondary schools in Wishart. The nearest government secondary schools are Mansfield State High School in neighbouring Mansfield to the north and MacGregor State High School in MacGregor to the south-west.

== See also ==
- List of Brisbane suburbs
