= Brisbane Adventist College =

Location
- 303 Broadwater Road; Brisbane, Queensland; 4122; Australia; 27°32′45″S 153°05′49″E

Information
- Type: Independent co-educational early learning, primary and secondary day school
- Motto: Everything with God
- Religious affiliation: Australian Union Conference of Seventh-day Adventists
- Denomination: Seventh-day Adventist
- Established: 1966; 60 years ago
- Principal: Peter Charleson
- Employees: 100
- Years taught: Prep–12
- Enrolment: 601
- Campus: Primary school: Mansfield; Secondary school: Wishart
- Campus type: Suburban
- Colours: Dark blue, white, gold
- Slogan: Everything with God
- Website: www.bac.qld.edu.au

Brisbane Adventist College is an independent Seventh-day Adventist co-educational early learning, primary and secondary day school located in the Brisbane suburbs of Mansfield (primary school) and Wishart (secondary school). Part of the Seventh-day Adventist education system, the world's second largest Christian school system. Enrolment is open to families of all faiths.

Brisbane Adventist College was established as a primary school in 1966 in the Mount Gravatt area. A secondary school was established along Wishart Road in 1972. The two schools operated separately until 1999, when they were amalgamated with the Early Learning Centre to form Brisbane Adventist College. The college provides Christian education to students from a range of surrounding communities.

== Spiritual aspects ==
All enrolled students take religion classes. These classes cover such topics as biblical history, and Christian and denominational doctrines. Teachers in other subject areas may also begin each class period with prayer or spiritual thought, and encourage student input. Weekly, the student body gathers for a chapel service at their neighbouring church (Mt Gravatt Seventh-Day Adventist Church) with special guests from time to time and the time periods (of the chapel service) ranging anywhere between 45 minutes to 1:30 hours.

== Sports ==
The college offers students access to touch football, basketball, rugby (league and/or union), netball, Futsal (soccer) and volleyball.

== Notable alumni ==
- Demi Harman – actress, Home and Away

== See also ==
- List of Seventh-day Adventist secondary and elementary schools
- Seventh-day Adventist education
- List of schools in Queensland
- List of Seventh-day Adventist secondary schools
