= Mansfield, Queensland =

Mansfield
- Suburb
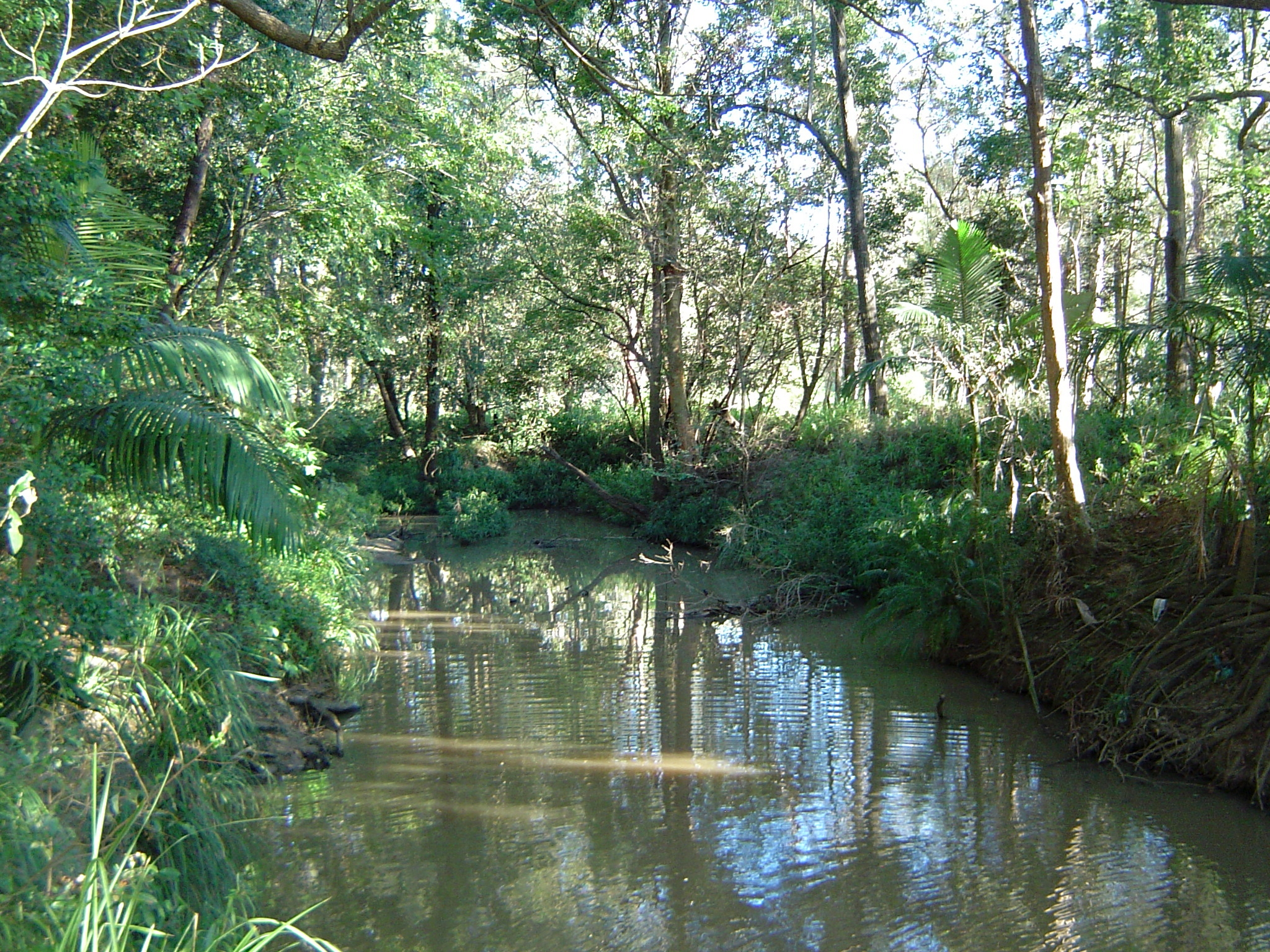
- Bulimba Creek at Wecker Road, 2014

- Interactive map of Mansfield
- Coordinates: 27.5336°S 153.1025°E
- Country: Australia
- State: Queensland
- City: Brisbane
- LGA: City of Brisbane (Chandler Ward)
- Location: 13.5 km (8.4 mi) SSE of Brisbane CBD
- Established: 1967 (gazetted)

Government
  - State electorate: Mansfield
  - Federal division: Bonner

Area
  - Total: 4.9 km^{2} (1.9 sq mi)

Population
  - Total: 8,851 (2021 census)
  - Density: 1,806/km^{2} (4,680/sq mi)
- Time zone: UTC+10:00 (AEST)
- Postcode: 4122
Suburbs around Mansfield
Carina Heights	Carindale	Carindale
Mount Gravatt East	Mansfield	Mackenzie
Upper Mount Gravatt	Wishart	Rochedale

Mansfield is a southern suburb in the City of Brisbane, Queensland, Australia. In the 2021 census, Mansfield had a population of 8,851 people.

== Geography ==
Mansfield is situated approximately 13.5 kilometres (8.4 mi) by road south-south-east of the Brisbane CBD.

Part of the eastern boundary of the suburb is marked by the Gateway Motorway.

== History ==
The suburb was named by the Queensland Place Names Board on 1 August 1967, after the Queensland Governor of the time Sir Alan Mansfield.

Brisbane Adventist College Primary Campus opened on 25 January 1966.

Mansfield State School opened on 27 January 1970.

Brisbane Adventist College Secondary Campus opened on 1973.

Mansfield State High School opened on 29 January 1974.

Christian Outreach College opened on 16 May 1978 in West End. It relocated to Mansfield in 1982, but is now within the suburb boundaries of Carindale. It is now known as Citepointe Christian College.

In 1999, the Brisbane Adventist Primary and Secondary Campuses amalgamated to created Brisbane Adventist College.

== Demographics ==
In the 2011 census, the population of Mansfield was 8,473 people, 51.8% female and 48.2% male. The median age of the Mansfield population was 38 years of age, 1 year above the Australian median. 69.8% of people living in Mansfield were born in Australia, compared to the national average of 69.8%; the next most common countries of birth were New Zealand 3.8%, England 2.9%, South Africa 1.5%, India 1.4%, China 1.1%. 76.1% of people spoke only English at home; the next most common languages were 2.8% Greek, 2.6% Cantonese, 1.3% Mandarin, 1.2% Arabic, 1% Hindi.

In the 2016 census, Mansfield had a population of 8,695 people. The suburb has a moderate Greek presence with under 2.3% of the population speaking Greek as a first language.

In the 2021 census, Mansfield had a population of 8,851 people.

== Education ==
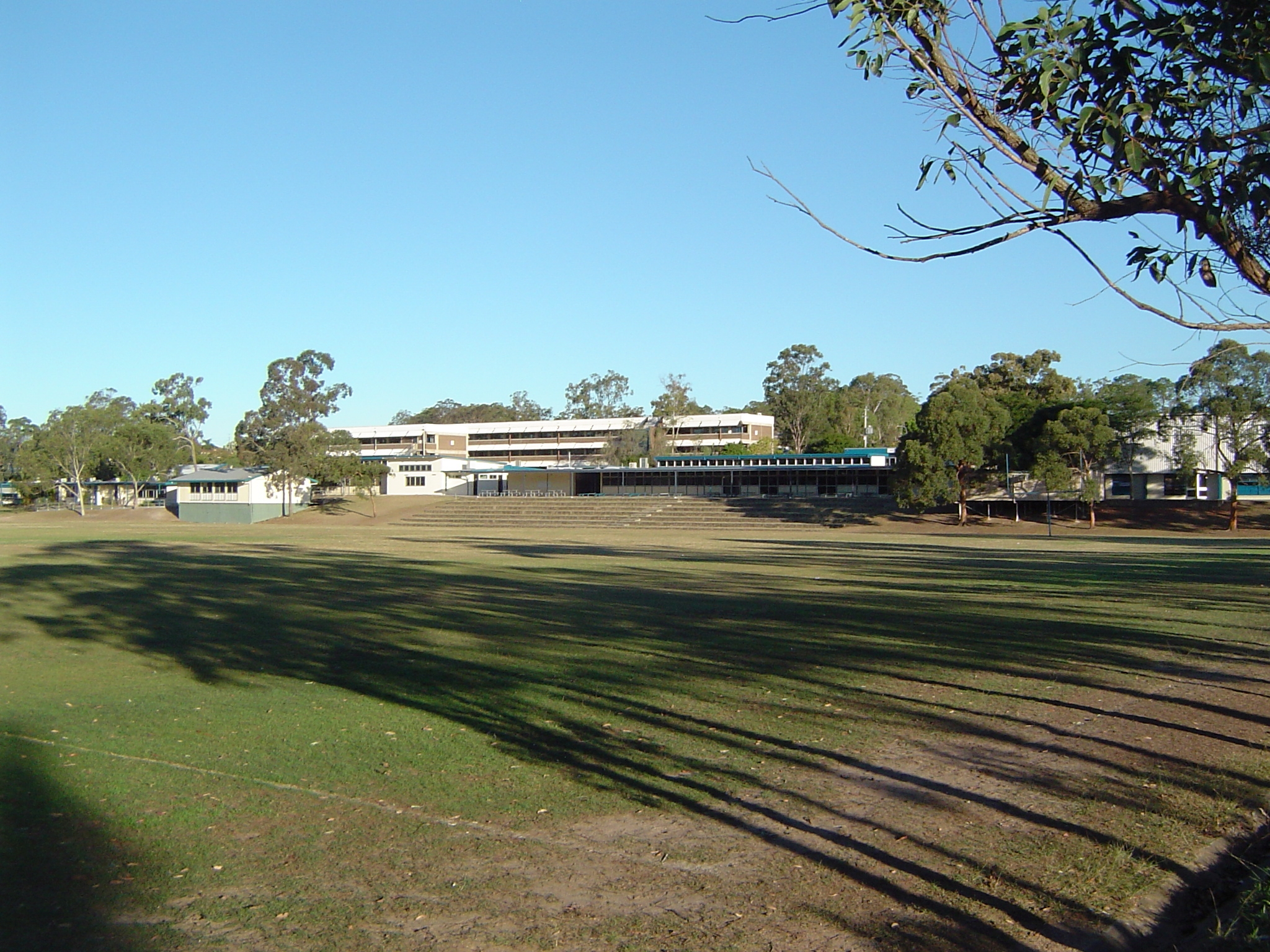
Mansfield State High School, 2014

Mansfield State School is a government primary (Prep–6) school for boys and girls at 174 Ham Road (27.5423°S 153.1053°E). In 2017, the school had an enrolment of 1,032 students with 73 teachers (60 full-time equivalent) and 32 non-teaching staff (21 full-time equivalent). In 2018, the school had an enrolment of 1,125 students with 79 teachers (67 full-time equivalent) and 32 non-teaching staff (22 full-time equivalent). It includes a special education program.

Brisbane Adventist College is a private primary and secondary (Prep–12) school for boys and girls at 303A Broadwater Road (27.5445°S 153.0976°E). In 2017, the school had an enrolment of 522 students with 46 teachers (40 full-time equivalent) and 19 non-teaching staff (14 full-time equivalent). In 2018, the school had an enrolment of 528 students with 43 teachers (38 full-time equivalent) and 23 non-teaching staff (17 full-time equivalent).

Mansfield State High School is a government secondary (7–12) school for boys and girls at Corner Broadwater & Ham Road (27.5454°S 153.1058°E). In 2017, the school had an enrolment of 2,448 students with 172 teachers (161 full-time equivalent) and 59 non-teaching staff (43 full-time equivalent). In 2018, the school had an enrolment of 2,599 students with 183 teachers (171 full-time equivalent) and 62 non-teaching staff (48 full-time equivalent). It includes a special education program.

== Amenities ==
The Mansfield Tavern has served as a venue for many local and touring musical acts. The venue has featured acts as The Offspring, Wickety Wak, Fear Factory, Hunters & Collectors, Madness, Hoodoo Gurus, The Angels and British rock band The Cult.

Mansfield is located in the region of the city which is now colloquially known as the "Bible Belt" due to the large number of people who have settled there to be close to Christian schools and churches.
