= Mackenzie, Queensland =

Mackenzie
- Suburb
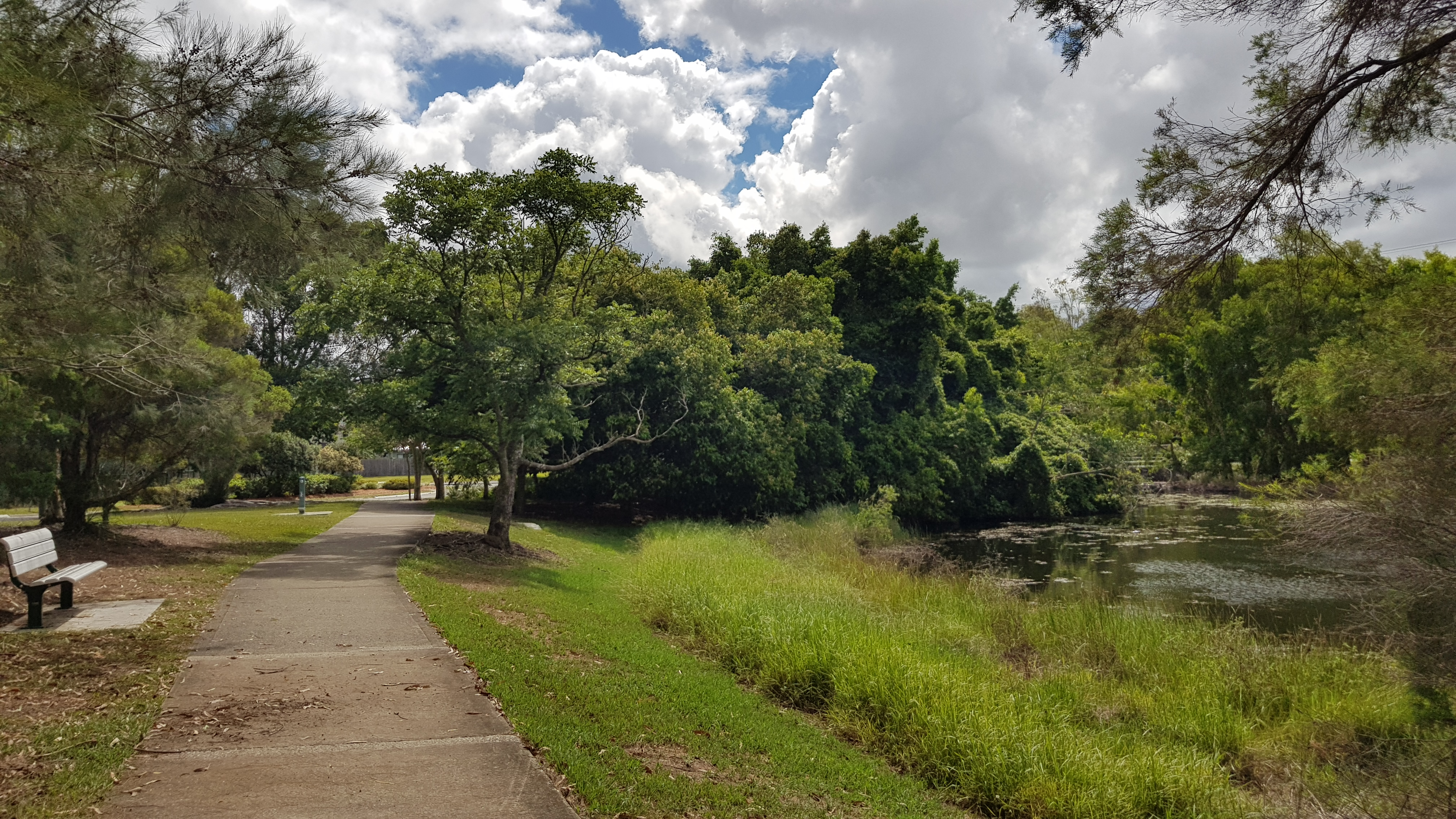
- Mount Petrie Road Park, 2018

- Interactive map of Mackenzie
- Coordinates: 27.5358°S 153.1302°E
- Country: Australia
- State: Queensland
- City: City of Brisbane
- LGA: City of Brisbane (Chandler Ward)
- Location: 16.1 km (10.0 mi) SE of Brisbane CBD

Government
  - State electorate: Mansfield
  - Federal division: Bonner

Area
  - Total: 3.3 km^{2} (1.3 sq mi)

Population
  - Total: 2,336 (2021 census)
  - Density: 708/km^{2} (1,833/sq mi)
- Time zone: UTC+10:00 (AEST)
- Postcode: 4156
Suburbs around Mackenzie
Carindale	Belmont	Burbank
Mansfield	Mackenzie	Burbank
Wishart	Rochedale	Burbank

Mackenzie is a south-eastern suburb in the City of Brisbane, Queensland, Australia. In the 2021 census, Mackenzie had a population of 2,336 people.

== Geography ==
The area is partially covered by undeveloped bushland.

== History ==
Mount Petrie State School (now known as Mackenzie State Primary School) opened on 31 March 1955.

Mount Gravatt Special School opened on 17 May 1971. On 21 September 2012, it was relocated to Mackenzie where it was co-located with Mount Petrie State School, with the schools being renamed MacKenzie State Primary School and Mackenzie Special School.

== Demographics ==
In the 2011 census, Mackenzie had a population of 1,844 people, 50.5% female and 49.5% male. The median age of the Mackenzie population was 36 years of age, 1 year below the Australian median. 71.4% of people living in Mackenzie were born in Australia, compared to the national average of 69.8%; the next most common countries of birth were England 3.1%, New Zealand 3.1%, South Africa 2.8%, Sri Lanka 1.5%, Hong Kong 1.1%. 79.5% of people spoke only English at home; the next most popular languages were 2.6% Cantonese, 2.3% Greek, 1.4% Sinhalese, 1.3% Afrikaans, 1% Serbian.

In the 2016 census, Mackenzie had a population of 2,094 people.

In the 2021 census, Mackenzie had a population of 2,336 people.

== Education ==
Mackenzie State Primary School is a government primary (Prep–6) school for boys and girls at 26 Vivaldi Place (27.5451°S 153.1225°E). In 2018, the school had an enrolment of 134 students with 11 teachers (9 full-time equivalent) and 7 non-teaching staff (4 full-time equivalent).

Mackenzie State Special School is a special primary and secondary (Prep–12) school for boys and girls at 26 Vivaldi Place (27.5451°S 153.1225°E). In 2018, the school had an enrolment of 115 students with 36 teachers (28 full-time equivalent) and 46 non-teaching staff (28 full-time equivalent).

There is no mainstream secondary school in Mackenzie. The nearest government secondary school is Mansfield State High School in neighbouring Mansfield to the west.

== Facilities ==
There is a petrol station located in Mackenzie. A number of residential estates with hundreds of new houses have been built in this suburb in the last decade. This is a suburb containing no large or small shopping centres. There has been a recent addition of a fitness station near the park.

== Amenities ==
ThreeSixteen Wesleyan Methodist Church is at 519 Mount Petrie Road (27.5403°S 153.1206°E). Hesed Grace (Chinese) Church, Mackenzie Samoan Church and Unity in Christ Tongan Church also hold services there. They are all part of the Wesleyan Methodist Church of Australia.

Gateway Baptist Church has a campus at 1052 Mount Gravatt Capalaba Road (27.5438°S 153.1315°E).

== Transport ==
It takes 20–25 minutes to drive the 20 kilometres (12 mi) to the Brisbane CBD via the South East Freeway (off-peak). Neighbouring suburbs include Belmont, Carindale, Mansfield, Rochedale, Upper Mount Gravatt, Wishart, Burbank and Chandler. Major roads such as Mount Gravatt – Capalaba Road and Gateway Motorway run through Mackenzie.

Mt Gravatt Bus services around Mackenzie, buses can access to Queen Elizabeth II Hospital, Garden City and City.

== See also ==
- List of Brisbane suburbs
