= Frankie Owen =

Australian synchronized swimmer (born 1988)

Personal information
- Full name: Francesca Owen
- Nationality: Australian
- Born: 27 March 1988 (age 38) Chester, United Kingdom
- Height: 157 cm (5 ft 2 in) (2012)
- Weight: 53 kg (117 lb) (2012)

Sport
- Country: Australia
- Sport: Synchronized swimming
- Coached by: Anna Nepotacheva, Marina Kholod

Achievements and titles
- Olympic finals: 2012 Summer Olympics

Francesca "Frankie" Owen (born 27 March 1988) is an Australian synchronized swimmer. She was selected to represent Australia at the 2012 Summer Olympics in synchronized swimming.

== Personal ==
Nicknamed Frankie, Owen was born on 27 March 1988 in Chester, United Kingdom. She moved to Australia with her Welsh father and English mother when she was a baby, though some members of her family continued to live in the area. She attended a primary school in Kimberley Park before going to Indooroopilly State High School. At Kimberley Park, future Olympic teammate Samantha Reid was one of her classmates. She later earned a Bachelor of Mass Communication in Marketing and Photography. As of 2012, she works as a Social Photographer for b105 and Triple M radio. She also works as a model for the Brisbane-based Dallys Models. As of 2012, she lives in Pullenvale, Queensland

Owen is 157 centimetres (5 ft 2 in) tall and weighs 53 kilograms (117 lb).

== Synchronized swimming ==
Owen is a synchronized swimmer, and has been coached by Marina Kholod and Anna Nepotcheva since 2011.

Owen has several honors. For 1998-1999 and 1999-2000, she was awarded the 12 Years and Under Solo Champion Trophy by Queensland Synchronized Swimming. In March 2002, she was awarded the 13 14 15 Years Solo Champion Trophy by Queensland Synchronized Swimming. In 2005-2006, she was award the Junior Figure Champion Trophy by Queensland Synchronized Swimming. She retired from the sport despite being only eighteen years old at the time only to unretire later.

Owen represented Australia at the 2005 World Championship in the team event. She competed at the 2006 Oceania Championships in the Combination Team and Junior Solo events. The FINA World Championships held in Shanghai, China served as the 2012 Olympic qualifying event for the team. In the technical team portion, her team finished 18th and in the Free Team event, her team finished 17th. She was selected to represent Australia at the 2012 Summer Olympics in synchronized swimming. The London Games were her first. She was 23 years old at the Games. She performed one of the team's solo performances in front of her extended family.
