= Training of rivers =

Training or entrance training refers to coastal structures built to constrain a river discharging across a littoral coast so that it discharges only where desired. Untrained entrances on sandy coasts tend to move widely and violently to discharge into the ocean, often upsetting those enjoying land nearby. With many cities (and buildings) constructed close to rivers, such management has historically been considered a necessary course of action, even though ecologically, non-intervention would be better and more sustainable.

A trained entrance often consists of rock walls that force the water into a deeper more stable channel. Trained entrances can provide better navigation, water quality and flood mitigation services, but can also cause beach erosion due to their interruption of longshore drift. One solution is the installation of a sand bypass system across the trained entrance.

Training is also used on mountainous rivers and streams, and ensures that a fast-flowing river is reduced in violence (and hence erosive capability), usually by the use of weirs and other structures like gabions. In many countries, gabion stepped weirs are commonly used for river training and flood control; the stepped design enhances the rate of energy dissipation in the channel, and it is particularly well-suited to the construction of gabion stepped weirs.
