= Mansfield State High School =

Location
- Mansfield, Queensland; Australia; 27°32′42″S 153°06′22″E

Information
- Type: Independent public, co-educational, secondary
- Motto: Steadfast
- Established: 1974
- Principal: Karen Tanks
- Enrolment: 3338 (2022)
- Campus: Mansfield, Queensland
- Colours: Teal, navy blue and white
- Website: mansfieldshs.eq.edu.au

Mansfield State High School is an independent public, co-educational secondary school of approximately 3700 students located in Mansfield, a suburb in Brisbane, Australia. It is on the corner of Broadwater Road and Ham Road. The school was established and opened in 1974. In recent years, the school has become known for its academic performance, as well as its specific programs including the French immersion, Music Enhancement, Technology Integrated Curriculum (TIC), Learning Support and Life Skills programs.

== Campus ==
The school is located adjacent to Mansfield State Primary School in the residential Brisbane suburb of Mansfield.

A new building, called P block, was constructed in late 2023 to increase capacity for arts, engineering and graphics subjects. The bottom floor of this building also acts as a car park for teachers and the outside acts as a drop off and pick up area for students. This has created controversy amongst the community for damaging traffic flow due to right turns.

A second building, called C Block, was constructed in late 2014 to increase the school's capacity to enroll 300 Year 7 students, who joined the secondary school after a change in the Queensland educational curriculum. The new building features over 40 new classrooms, including classrooms with computers, graphics classrooms and science laboratories.

A third building, called J Block has been added and was ready for students in the early weeks of Term One, 2020. SC block (Science Center) has been built, as well as a new sports hall (SP, Sports Center). The construction for a new assembly hall is also complete.

Mansfield State High School was also the second largest government secondary school in Queensland back on the 17th of November, 2021.

The school has two canteens, with one serving coffee and an after school sports centre available for hire. It also has a catering service which sells food during personal development days, functions, and other after school activities. In addition, it has a specialised building, E Block, for the individualised support of disabled students.

== Academics ==
In 1990, six of its students received the highest possible Tertiary Entrance (TE) score possible, which was 990.

In 2013, 15 Year 12 students at Mansfield State High School attained an OP 1.

In 2015, the school produced an average NAPLAN score of 602, the highest in the south-side patch, outperforming the Anglican Church Grammar School (598) and the Brisbane Boys' College (591). 31% of graduates in 2015 received an OP 1–5.

In 2021, several of its students received high results. 7 Grade 12 students received 100/100 over all 5 subjects, a further 11 achieved 99/100 over 5 subjects. 30 students achieved 25/25 in external exams in different subjects. 1 student achieved 50/50 in General Maths, 13 achieving 49/50. 10 Students achieved an ATAR greater than 99.5. 45% of students received an ATAR greater than 90.0.

Mansfield's curriculum covers subjects including: Music; Mathematics; Film, Television and New Media; Science; English; Computer Technologies/Studies; Manual Arts; Health and Physical Education; LOTE (French or Japanese); Business Enterprise; Art; Home Economics and SOSE (Study Of Society and Environment).

In addition to its French Immersion, Technology Integrated Curriculum and Music programs, it also has a Life Skills program for the specialised care of disabled students needing social and behavioural support, and a Learning Support program for the individualised care of intellectually disabled students.

== Enrolment Numbers ==
Mansfield State High School's maximum capacity is 2,194 students. It had 3,338 enrolments in 2022.

Mansfield State High School's core intake of students comes from its local catchment area, with 90% of students residing within the catchment zone.

As of February 2026 there are 3,978 students at MSHS. This puts the school at over 122% of its current enrolment capacity of 3,252, making it one of the most overcrowded schools in Queensland.

=== Grade by Grade ===
Year 7 : 675

Year 8 : 697

Year 9 : 739

Year 10 : 678

Year 11 : 615

Year 12 : 574

== Music ==
=== Ensembles ===
The school's premier ensemble, which it calls the Concert Band, has won the Queensland Music Festival for several years, and in 2006, made it to the Grand Final of Fanfare (a Queensland music competition). In the past, the band has been requested for performances such as the Commonwealth Games Torch Relay, Anzac Day ceremonies, as well as private events. In 2013, under the direction of choral conductor Margaret Long, the school's Chorale performed in the biannual Education Queensland Choral Fanfare Gala Concert (representing the Queensland Metropolitan Region) In 2015, the senior choir, Chorale, participated in the Creative Generation State Schools on stage production as a feature choir ensemble.

=== Musical ===
The school produces a musical biannually.

== Principals ==
Murray Kay joined the school in 1990, the same year that the school's French Immersion program commenced. He left after a horse-riding accident requiring physical treatment.

In 2011, James Sloman became the principal after Kay retired in 2010. In 2014, Sloman oversaw the school's transition to an independent public school, before leaving.

In 2015, Karen Tanks became the principal after being replaced for her former same role at Rochedale State High School that she had for the previous five years. In 2018, Tanks controversially introduced a "clean shaven" policy for school photographs, in which students were forcibly shaved. After media outrage, this policy was modified such that students must seek a religious, cultural or other exemption.

== Sport ==
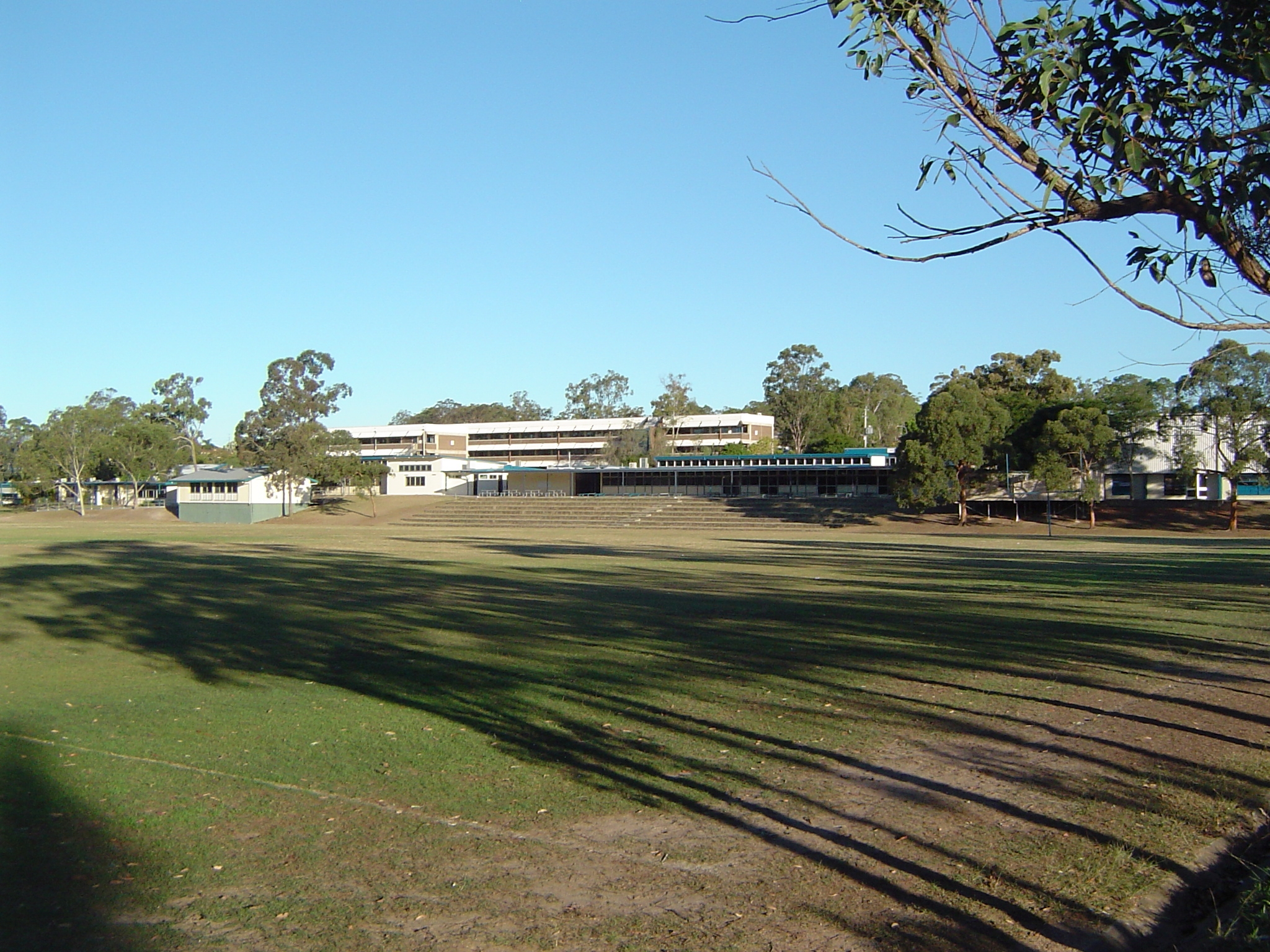
Oval and buildings, 2014

Many Mansfield sport teams have competed in Metropolitan Finals, and the school has also produced students and graduates who represented Australia in international events. One Mansfield alumnus, Matthew Mitcham, was a gold medal-winning Olympic diver.

=== Houses ===
Mansfield students and teaching staff are allocated a house in which they remain for their entire enrolment period at the school. This allocation is organised by the first letter of their family name. The four houses' names are dedicated to people renowned for their effort in world peace:

- Hammarskjöld (after Dag Hammarskjöld, gold, family names starting letters A–D)
- Gandhi (after Mahatma Gandhi, blue, family names starting letters E–K)
- Schweitzer (after Albert Schweitzer, green, family names starting letters L–P)
- U Thant (after U Thant, red, family names starting letters Q–Z)

== Notable alumni ==
The members of The Jungle Giants attended Mansfield State High School.

Mansfield has also had four professional divers attend the school, now all representing Australia at an international level; Loudy Wiggins (Bronze Medalist at Sydney), Matthew Mitcham, Sharleen Stratton (Gold Medalist) and Scott Robertson.

== See also ==
- Education in Australia
- List of schools in Greater Brisbane
