= Mount Thompson =

Mount Thompson may refer to:

- Mount Thompson (Antarctica)
- Mount Thompson (Alberta), in the Canadian Rockies
- Mount Thompson (California), in the Sierra Nevada range
- Mount Thompson (Montana) in the Lewis Range, Glacier National Park, United States
- Mount Thompson (Queensland) in Australia
- Mount Thompson crematorium, in Brisbane, Queensland, Australia
- Mount Thomson, in Washington state, previously spelled Thompson
- Mount Tommy Thompson, North Cascades, Washington
