= Mount Gravatt East =

- Suburb
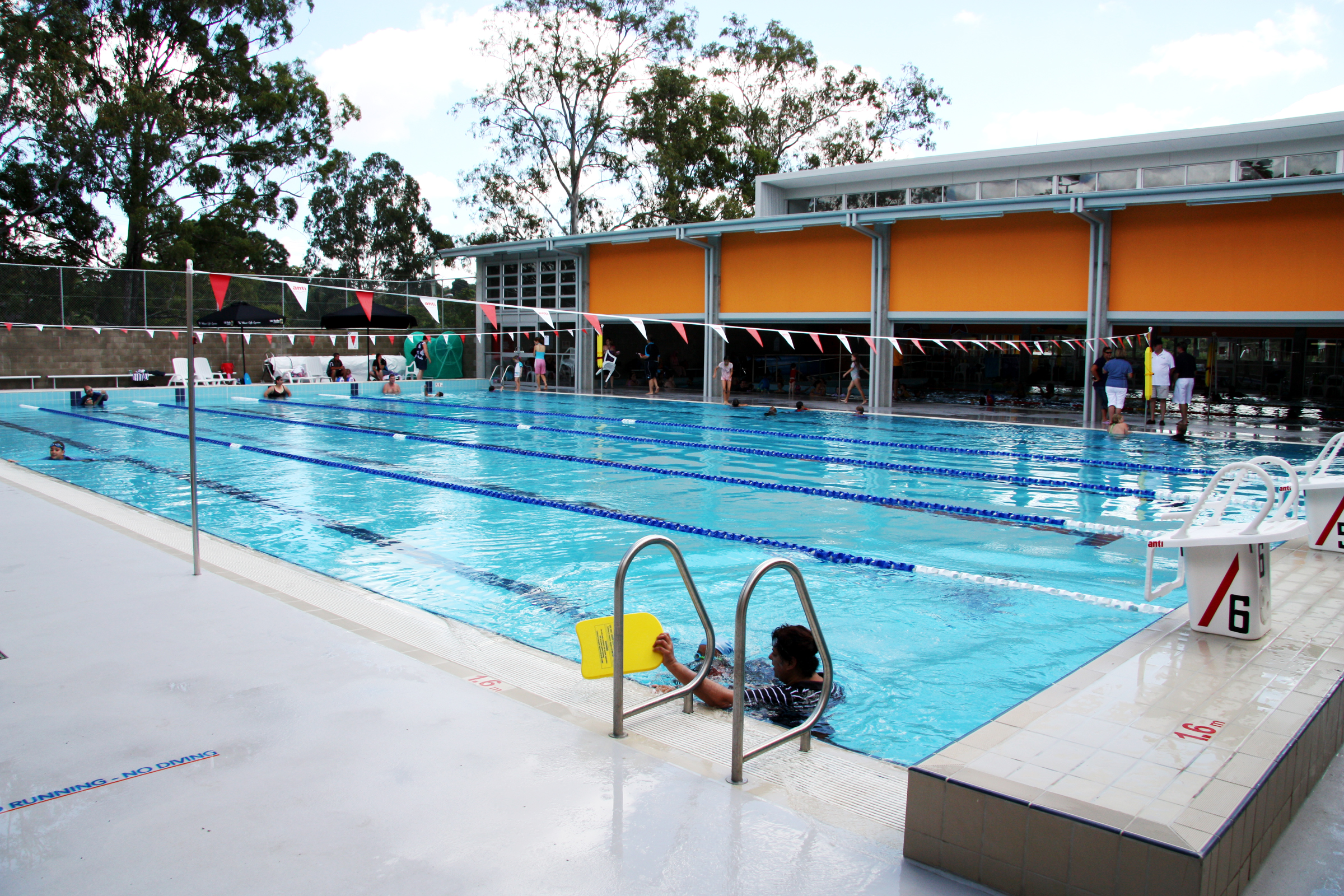
- Mount Gravatt East Aquatic Centre, 2009

- Interactive map of Mount Gravatt East
- Coordinates: 27.5302°S 153.0855°E
- Country: Australia
- State: Queensland
- City: Brisbane
- LGA: City of Brisbane (Holland Park Ward)
- Location: 11.0 km (6.8 mi) SSE of Brisbane CBD
- Established: 1967

Government
  - State electorate: Mansfield
  - Federal divisions: Bonner; Griffith

Area
  - Total: 4.6 km^{2} (1.8 sq mi)

Population
  - Total: 12,428 (2021 census)
  - Density: 2,702/km^{2} (7,000/sq mi)
- Time zone: UTC+10:00 (AEST)
- Postcode: 4122
Suburbs around Mount Gravatt East
Holland Park	Carina Heights	Carindale
Holland Park West	Mount Gravatt East	Mansfield
Mount Gravatt	Upper Mount Gravatt	Wishart

Mount Gravatt East is a southern suburb in the City of Brisbane, Queensland, Australia. In the 2021 census, Mount Gravatt East had a population of 12,428 people.

== Geography ==
Mount Gravatt East is located 8 kilometres (5 mi) southeast of the central business district.

There is a variety of hills, one of them being Mount Thompson (27.5292°S 153.0789°E) at 190 metres (620 ft) above sea level.

On land owned by Boral along Pine Mountain Road, an old quarry has filled with water. Despite being fenced off, trespassers have gained access and used the dam as a swimming hole. A Brisbane City Council report found the water had a pH level of about 3.3 and contained traces of metals making it unsuitable for human contact.

== History ==
The suburb was first gazetted in 1967. It was named after Mount Gravatt, a nearby landmark, which in turn was named in 1840 by surveyor Robert Dixon after Lieutenant George Gravatt, the commandant at the Moreton Bay penal colony from May to July 1839.

On 20 June 1891, the Blantyre estate was auctioned by G.T. Bell. 12 subdivided allotments were up for sale. The allotments were on the corner of Cavendish Road and Creek Road.

Creek Road State School opened on 29 August 1955. In January 1956 it was renamed Mount Gravatt East State School.

Seton College was established on 3 February 1964 by the Daughters of Charity of St Elizabeth Ann Seton.

St Marks Lutheran Primary School opened on 23 January 2006. As at 2020, the school has closed.

== Demographics ==
In the 2011 census, the population of Mount Gravatt East was 10,891, 50.9% female and 49.1% male. The median age of the Mount Gravatt East population was 34 years of age, 3 years below the Australian median. 71.8% of people living in Mount Gravatt East were born in Australia, compared to the national average of 69.8%; the next most common countries of birth were New Zealand 3.5%, England 2.8%, India 2.2%, South Africa 1%, China 0.9%. 79.8% of people spoke English as their first language, with 1.6% Greek, 1.4% Mandarin, 1.1% Arabic, 1% Punjabi and 0.9% Cantonese.

In the 2016 census, Mount Gravatt East had a population of 11,838 people.

In the 2021 census, Mount Gravatt East had a population of 12,428 people.

== Education ==
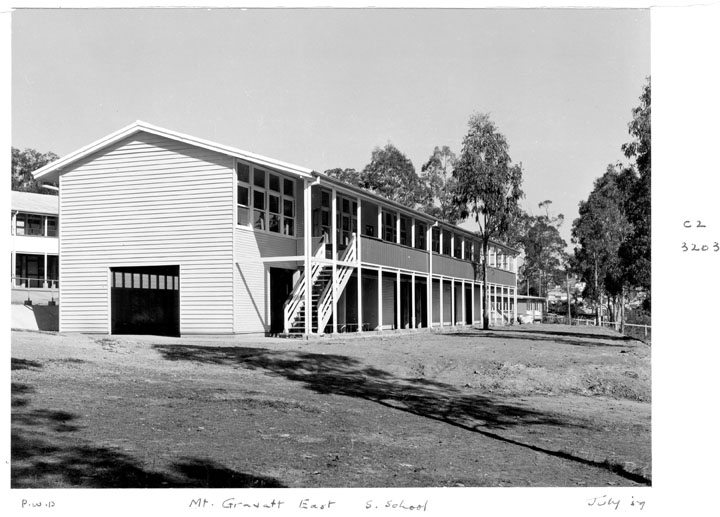
Mount Gravatt East State School, July 1959

Mount Gravatt East State School is a government primary (Prep–6) school for boys and girls at Newnham Road (27.5337°S 153.0943°E). In 2017, the school had an enrolment of 283 students with 23 teachers (19 full-time equivalent) and 20 non-teaching staff (12 full-time equivalent).

Seton College is a Catholic secondary (7–12) school for boys and girls at 1148 Cavendish Road (27.5295°S 153.0922°E). In 2017, the school had an enrolment of 326 students with 47 teachers (44 full-time equivalent) and 46 non-teaching staff (34 full-time equivalent). The school is closing, with new enrolments ceasing at the end of 2024, but existing students will be able to continue their education at the school.

There is no government secondary school in the suburb. The nearest government secondary schools are in neighbouring suburbs: Mount Gravatt State High School in Mount Gravatt, Cavendish Road State High School in Holland Park, and Mansfield State High School in Mansfield.

== Amenities ==
The Dormition of Our Lady Greek Orthodox Church is at 269 Creek Road (27.5338°S 153.0915°E). Their feast day is 15 August.
