= Upper Mount Gravatt =

- Suburb
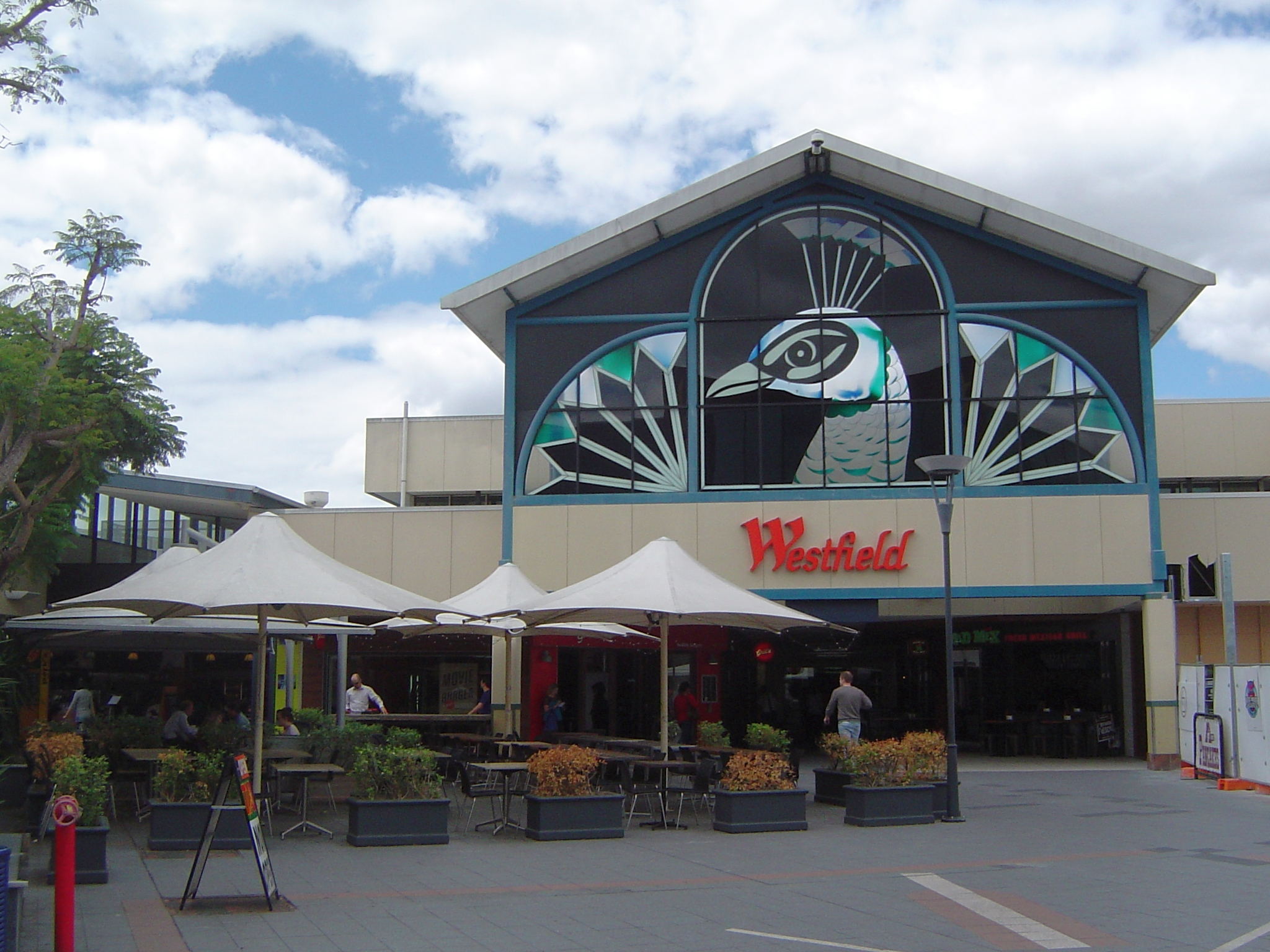
- Westfield Mt Gravatt

- Interactive map of Upper Mount Gravatt
- Coordinates: 27.5552°S 153.0797°E
- Country: Australia
- State: Queensland
- City: Brisbane
- LGA: City of Brisbane (MacGregor Ward)
- Location: 12.5 km (7.8 mi) SSE of Brisbane CBD

Government
  - State electorate: Mansfield
  - Federal division: Bonner

Area
  - Total: 4.3 km^{2} (1.7 sq mi)

Population
  - Total: 10,800 (2021 census)
  - Density: 2,510/km^{2} (6,510/sq mi)
- Time zone: UTC+10:00 (AEST)
- Postcode: 4122
Suburbs around Upper Mount Gravatt
Mount Gravatt	Mount Gravatt East	Mansfield
Nathan	Upper Mount Gravatt	Wishart
MacGregor	MacGregor	Eight Mile Plains

Upper Mount Gravatt is a southern suburb in the City of Brisbane, Queensland, Australia. In the 2021 census, Upper Mount Gravatt had a population of 10,800 people.

== Geography ==
Upper Mount Gravatt is south of Mount Gravatt.The Pacific Motorway and South-East Busway form the western boundary of the suburb. Logan Road enters the suburb from the north (Mount Gravatt) and exits to the south (Eight Mile Plains).

Westfield Mt Gravatt, a major shopping centre, is a regional "hub", containing services and popular restaurants. It is on the southern corner of Logan Road and Kessels Road (27.5621°S 153.08180°E). It has a bus interchange and the Upper Mount Gravatt Busway Station immediately below it.

== History ==
Upper Mount Gravatt State School opened on 1 October 1929. It has also been called Mount Gravatt Upper State School.

St Bernard's School was established on 24 January 1953 by the Sisters of St Joseph of the Sacred Heart under principal Sister Juliana. Mrs Doreen Bazzo was the first lay principal. The first building on the site was a combined church and school, but later moved into separate school buildings.

St Joseph's High School for Girls was established in 1964 in Holland Park by the Sisters of St Joseph of the Sacred Heart. In 1970, the school was relocated to Klumpp Road (onto the site also occupied by St Bernard's School and Clairvaux College) and renamed MacKillop College.

Clairvaux College was established by the Christian Brothers on 1 February 1966 on part of the 10-acre (4.0 ha) site already partially occupied by St Bernard's School.

Westfield Mt Gravatt was opened as one of Brisbane's largest shopping centres on 1 October 1970 by Queensland Premier Joh Bjelke-Petersen. It cost $10 million and occupied a 28-acre (11 ha) site.

The Garden City Library was established by the Brisbane City Council as one of the initial tenants and the library had a major refurbishment in 1996.

St Catherine's Catholic Primary School was established on 4 March 1973 by the Presentation Sisters. It was officially opened by Archbishop Francis Rush. In 1979, the closure of a nearby school led to a large increase in enrolments. In 1986, the first lay principal was appointed.

In 1985, MacKillop College (a girls' school) and Clairvaux College (a boys' school) were combined to form Clairvaux Mackillop College.

== Demographics ==
In the 2011 census, Upper Mount Gravatt had a population of 8,851 people, 51.1% female and 48.9% male. The median age of the Upper Mount Gravatt population was 34 years, 3 years below the Australian median of 37. 59.4% of people living in Upper Mount Gravatt were born in Australia, compared to the national average of 69.8%; the next most common countries of birth were New Zealand 3.3%, China 3.1%, India 2.9%, England 2.7%, Korea, Republic of 1.4%. 67% of people spoke only English at home; the next most common languages were 4.1% Mandarin, 2% Cantonese, 1.4% Korean, 1.4% Arabic, 1.1% Greek.

In the 2016 census, Upper Mount Gravatt had a population of 9,241 people, 51.9% female and 48.1% male. The median age of the Upper Mount Gravatt population was 32 years, 6 years below the Australian median of 38. 57.9% of people living in Upper Mount Gravatt were born in Australia; the next most common countries of birth were China (excludes SARs and Taiwan) 8.0%, New Zealand 3.1%, India 3.1%, England 2.6% and Korea, Republic of (South) 2.0%. 64.3% of people spoke only English at home; the next most common languages were 9.3% Mandarin, 2.4% Cantonese, 2.1% Korean, 1.3% Vietnamese and 1.0% Punjabi.

In the 2021 census, Upper Mount Gravatt had a population of 10,800 people, 50.9% female and 49.1% male. The median age of the Upper Mount Gravatt population was 33 years, 5 years below the Australian median of 38. 55.6% of people living in Upper Mount Gravatt were born in Australia; the next most common countries of birth were China (excludes SARs and Taiwan) 7.0%, India 3.7%, New Zealand 3.1%, Korea, Republic of (South) 2.8% and England 2.1%. 60.7% of people spoke only English at home; the next most common languages were 9.8% Mandarin, 3.3% Cantonese, 2.9% Korean, 1.1% Hindi and 1.0% Vietnamese.

== Education ==
Upper Mount Gravatt State School is a government primary (Prep–6) school for boys and girls at 1899 Logan Road (27.5564°S 153.0799°E). In 2018, the school had an enrolment of 507 students with 35 teachers (33 full-time equivalent) and 22 non-teaching staff (15 full-time equivalent). It includes a special education program.

St Bernard's School is a Catholic primary (Prep–6) school for boys and girls at 1823 Logan Road (27.5541°S 153.0795°E). In 2018, the school had an enrolment of 366 students with 28 teachers (23 full-time equivalent) and 19 non-teaching staff (9 full-time equivalent).

St Catherine's Catholic Primary School is a Catholic primary (Prep–6) school for boys and girls at 388 Newnham Road (27.5514°S 153.0929°E). In 2018, the school had an enrolment of 512 students with 35 teachers (30 full-time equivalent) and 20 non-teaching staff (13 full-time equivalent).

Clairvaux Mackillop College is a Catholic secondary (7–12) school for boys and girls at Klumpp Road (27.5528°S 153.0778°E). In 2018, the school had an enrolment of 1,265 students with 110 teachers (106 full-time equivalent) and 52 non-teaching staff (43 full-time equivalent).

There is no government secondary school in Upper Mount Gravatt. The nearest government secondary schools are Mount Gravatt State High School in neighbouring Mount Gravatt to the north-west, Mansfield State High School in neighbouring Mansfield to the north-east, and MacGregor State High School in neighbouring MacGregor to the south-west.

== Amenities ==
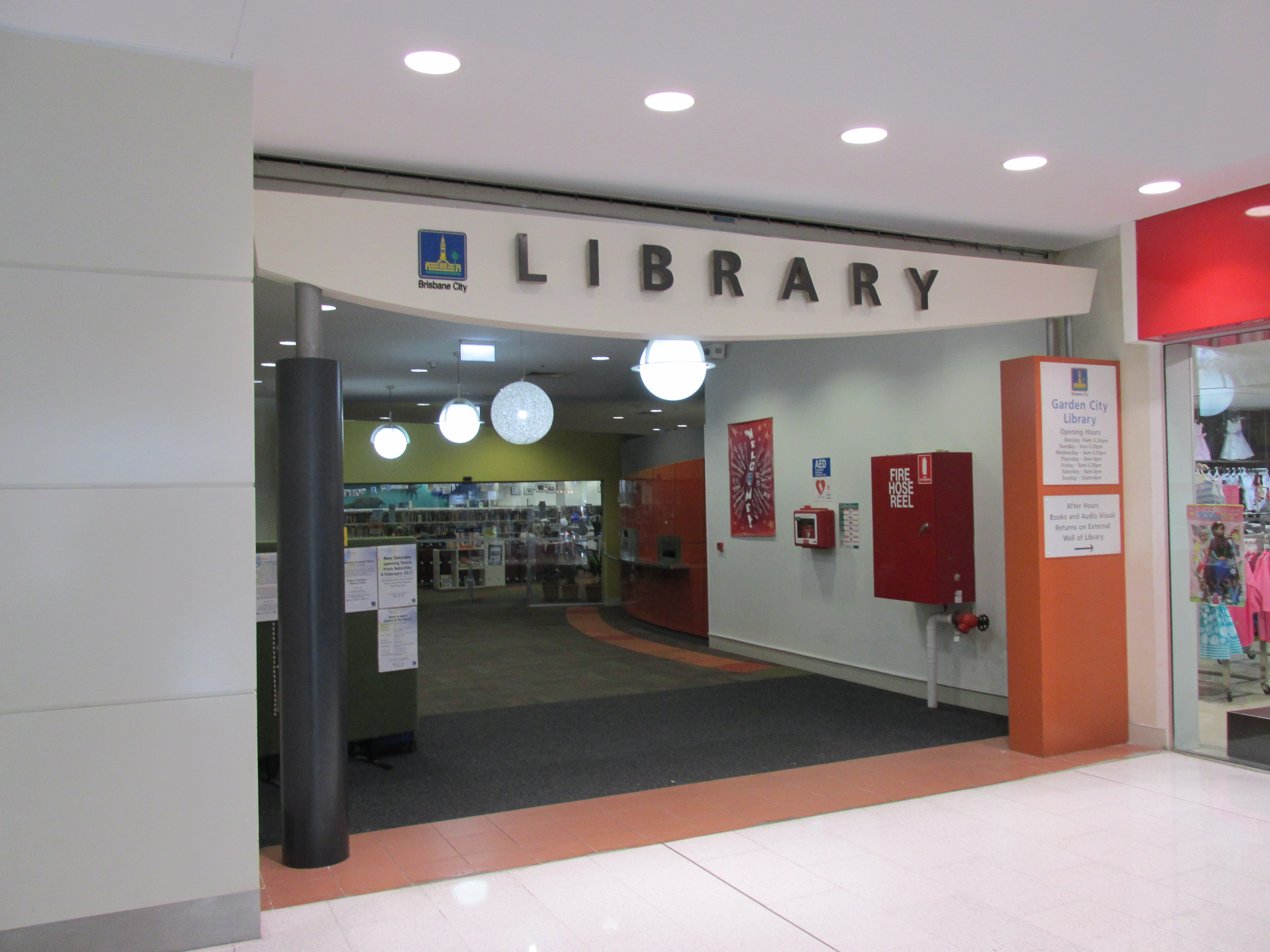
Library entrance in Westfield Mt Gravatt Shopping Centre, 2018

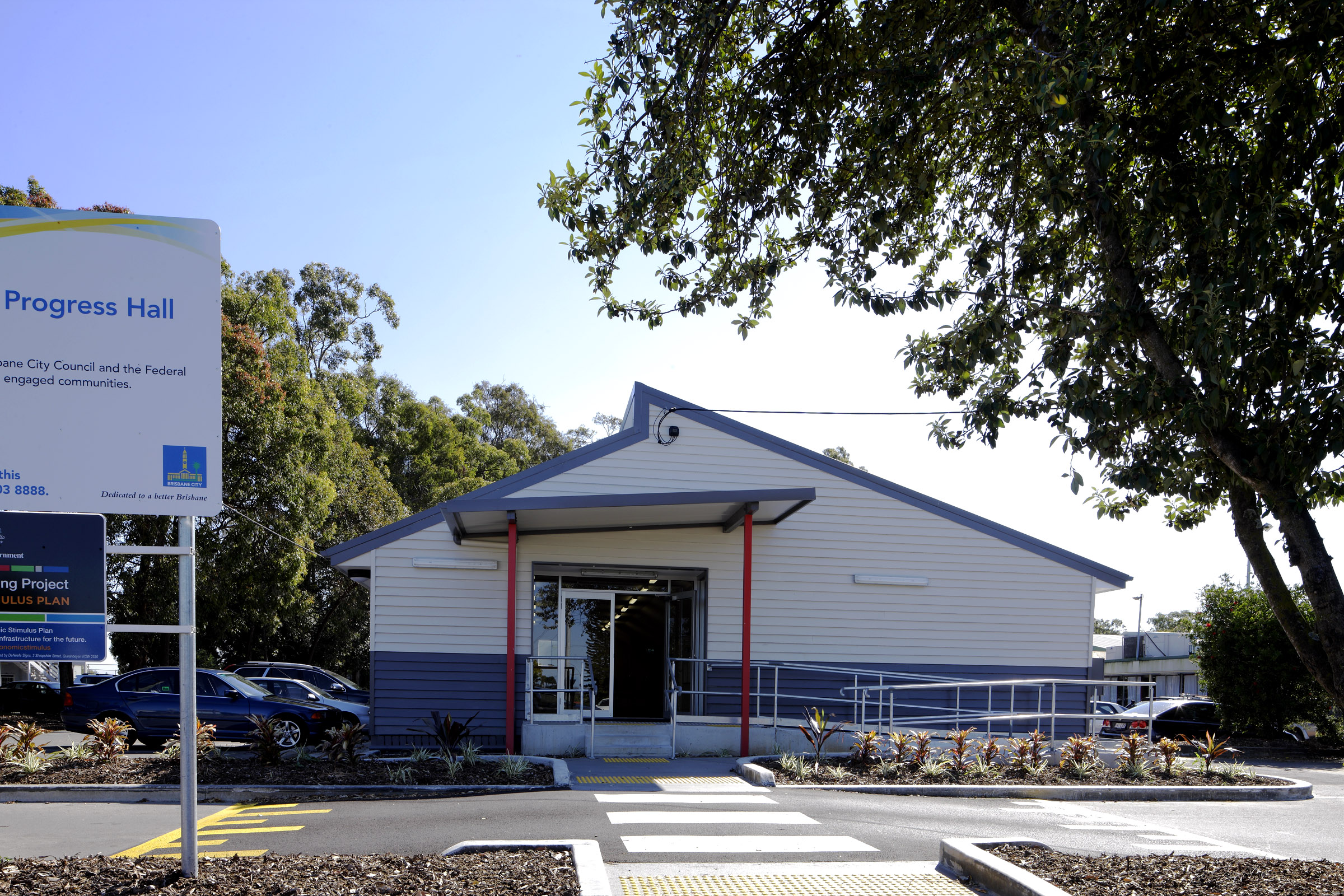
The entrance to Upper Mount Gravatt Progress Hall, 2011

The Brisbane City Council operates a public library at Westfield Mt Gravatt (27.5613°S 153.0810°E).

Mount Gravatt Park is at 1873 Logan Road (27.5556°S 153.0797°E). It hosts a number of amenities. The Upper Mount Gravatt Progress Hall is operated by the Brisbane City Council and can be hired for community events. The Mount Gravatt Bowls Club has both undercover and outdoor bowling greens and a restaurant and bar.

Upper Mount Gravatt is also home to the Mount Gravatt Vultures, a Queensland Australian Football League Club on Klumpp Road. The club were premiers in 2007.

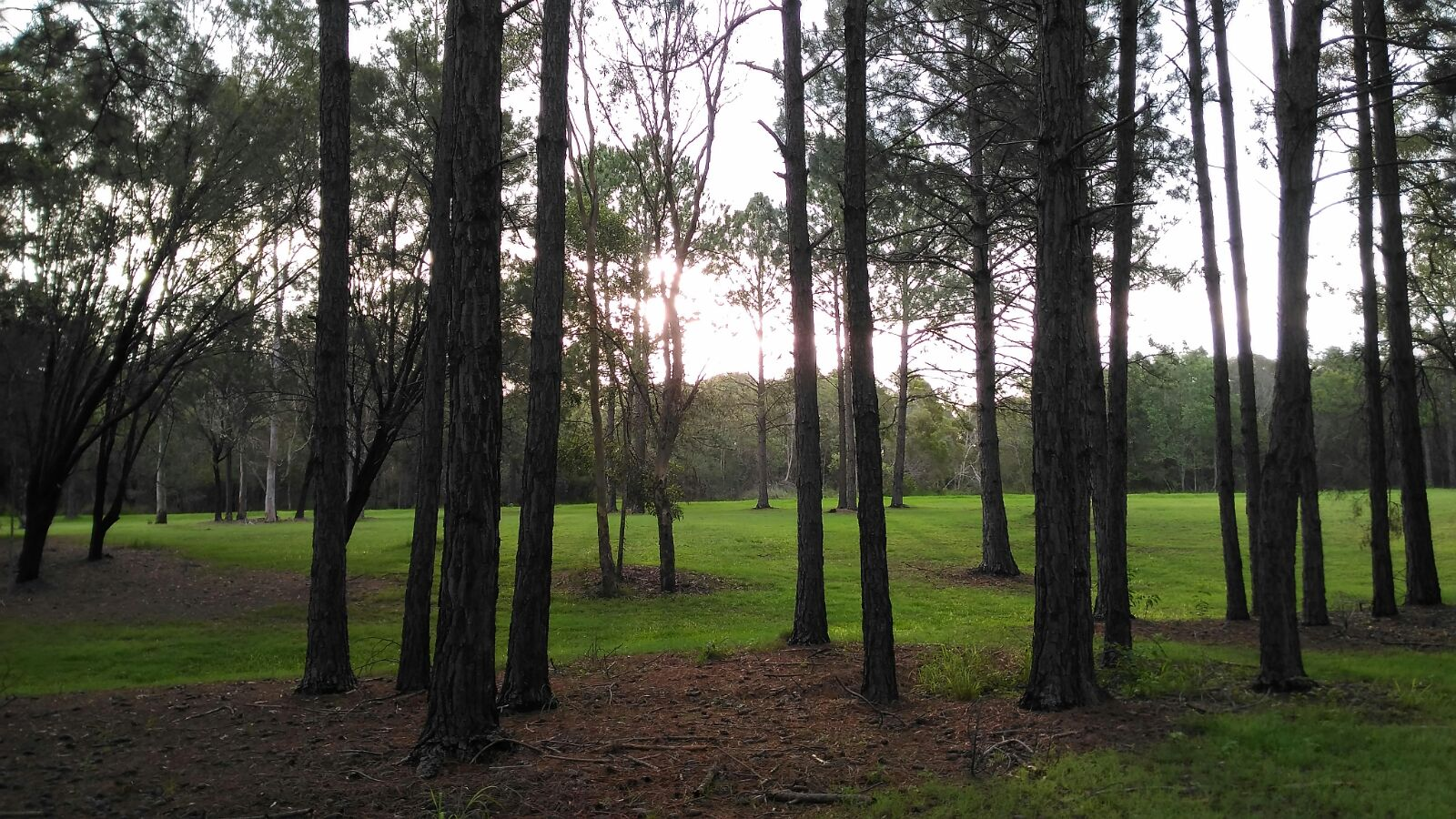
Malinya Place Park, 2017
