= Upper Mount Gravatt State School =

Primary school in Queensland, Australia

Location
- 1899 Logan Road, Upper Mount Gravatt, Queensland, Australia; 27.5566°S 153.0797°E

Information
- School type: Independent public, co-educational, primary
- Established: 1929
- Principal: Derek Brady
- Teaching staff: 39 (2023)
- Years offered: Prep – Year 6
- Enrolment: 507 (2023)
- Colors: Blue; Light Blue; White
- Website: Official website

Upper Mount Gravatt State School is an independent public co-educational primary school located in the Brisbane suburb of Upper Mount Gravatt, Queensland, Australia. It is administered by the Queensland Department of Education, with an enrolment of 507 students and a teaching staff of 39, as of 2023. The school serves students from Prep to Year 6. Its opening unofficially established the suburb of Upper Mount Gravatt.

== History ==
The community came together and cleared the grounds of trees and scrub for the construction of the school. The budget of £1,117 for the erection of the school was given by the Public Works department in May 1929.

On 19 September 1929, the Education Department formally announced a school would open in Upper Mount Gravatt. The school opened on 1 October 1929, with the official opening ceremony occurring on Saturday afternoon, 5 October 1929. Approximately 300 people attended the ceremony, which was led by the education minister at the time, Reginald King. The cost of the school was £1,123. It had 60 foundation students out of a capacity of 80. By the end of 1930, the enrolment had reached 81.

In 1930, a proposal for the then tramline to be extended 3 miles (4.8 km) from Holland Park to the school was declined due to the population of the region not being significant enough to justify the extension at the time.

2 acres were intended to be added to the school grounds in July 1952, but was postponed until August 1953, with the land of the school increasing to 5 acres in 1953. In 1973, as part of a scheme to improve schools in Queensland, the school received $48,477 to construct a library.

On 23 October 1961 a majority of the school was destroyed by a fire, with most, if not all Admission Registers prior to this date being destroyed. A new register was created, which began with the top grade (at this time it was Eighth) of the school and descending down in order. Another fire occurred In June 2019, with a building being completely destroyed. The fire was treated as suspicious and the building needed to be demolished. The construction of a new building was completed in July 2021, with it officially opening on 3 November 2021. The cost of the building was $9.21 million.

== Demographics ==
In 2023, the school had a student enrolment of 507 with 39 teachers (34.2 full-time equivalent) and 25 non-teaching staff (15.9 full-time equivalent). Female enrolments consisted of 243 students and Male enrolments consisted of 264 students; Indigenous enrolments accounted for a total of 7% and 49% of students had a language background other than English.

== See also ==
- Education in Queensland
- List of schools in Greater Brisbane
