= Residential colleges of Griffith University =

There are four residential colleges at Griffith University. The buildings on each Griffith University campus are given a number in the order that they were built on that particular campus. N denotes Nathan campus, M is for Mount Gravatt, L is for Logan and G is for the Gold Coast.

== Colleges ==
=== Bellenden Ker College ===
Bellenden Ker College
- Griffith University
- Full name: Bellenden Ker College
- Established: 1980's
- Named for: Bellenden Ker
- Gender: Co-educational
- Website: https://www.griffith.edu.au/accommodation/on-campus-accommodation

- Bellenden Ker College, a.k.a. BK, is a co-educational college located on the Nathan Campus in the Toohey forest reserve.
- The building (N39) that houses the college was originally constructed to house athletes for the Brisbane Commonwealth Games in 1982.
- The coat of arms of the college are two griffins quartered with the acronym BK. The Griffins were taken from the family coat of arms of Sir Samuel Griffith the man for whom the university is named.

=== KGBC ===
KGBC Colleges
- Griffith University
- Full name: Kinaba-, Girraween-, Barakula-, Carnarvon college
- Established: 1980's
- Gender: Co-educational
- Website: https://www.griffith.edu.au/accommodation/on-campus-accommodation

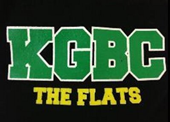
The logo of the college

- KGBC also known as "The Flats" consist of four co-educational undergraduate and postgraduate apartments on the Nathan Campus.
- Kinaba college (N30), Girraween college (N24) and Barakula college (N15) all house undergraduate flat-shares and are self-catered.
- Carnarvon college (N47) is composed of post-graduate, self-catered flats.

=== Mount Gravatt College ===
Mount Gravatt College
- Griffith University
- Full name: Mount Gravatt Residential College
- Established: 1980's
- Named for: Mount Gravatt
- Gender: Co-educational
- Website: https://www.griffith.edu.au/accommodation/on-campus-accommodation

- Mt Gravatt College, a.k.a. MG, is a co-educational college located on the Mt Gravatt Campus which itself sits on the hill for which the surrounding suburbs are named.
- The college consists of three main buildings, namely: Bundara (M03), the Roundhouse (M04) and Lowana (M05).

=== Griffith University Village ===
Griffith University Village
- Griffith University
- Full name: Griffith University Village
- Established: 2000's
- Gender: Co-educational
- Website: http://www.mystudentvillage.com//au/griffith-university-village/

- Griffith University Village is a collection of co-ed apartments on the Gold Coast Campus.
- The village is privately operated and is also the newest residential college at Griffith University.

== See also ==
- List of universities in Australia
