= Holland Park West, Queensland =

Holland Park West
- Suburb
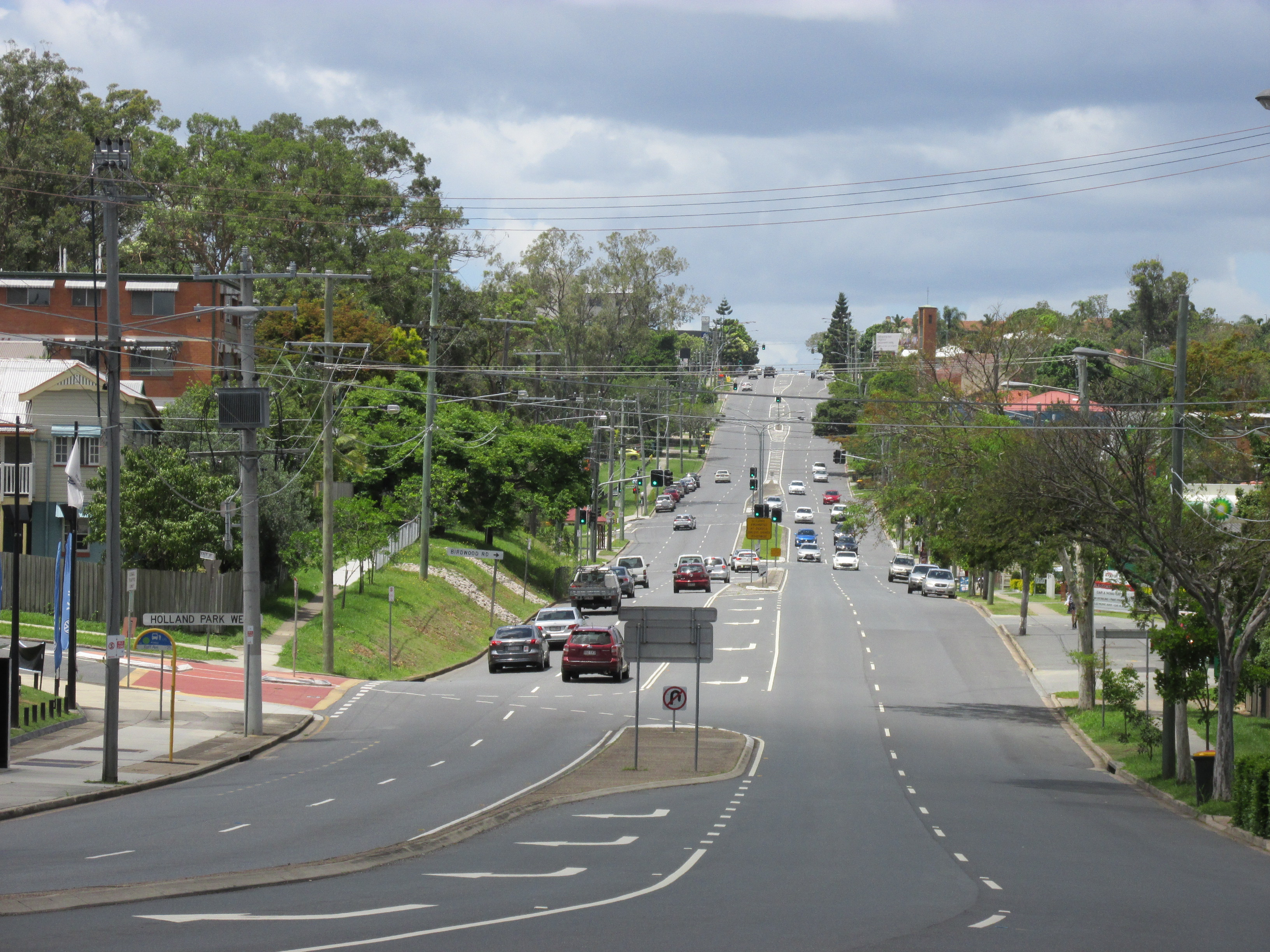
- View along Logan Road at Holland Park West, 2017

- Interactive map of Holland Park West
- Coordinates: 27.5233°S 153.0594°E
- Country: Australia
- State: Queensland
- City: Brisbane
- LGA: City of Brisbane (Holland Park Ward)
- Location: 8.4 km (5.2 mi) SSE of Brisbane CBD

Government
  - State electorate: Greenslopes
  - Federal divisions: Griffith; Bonner

Area
  - Total: 2.8 km^{2} (1.1 sq mi)

Population
  - Total: 6,468 (2021 census)
  - Density: 2,310/km^{2} (5,980/sq mi)
- Time zone: UTC+10:00 (AEST)
- Postcode: 4121
Suburbs around Holland Park West
Greenslopes	Holland Park	Holland Park
Tarragindi	Holland Park West	Mount Gravatt East
Nathan	Mount Gravatt	Mount Gravatt

Holland Park West is a southern suburb in the City of Brisbane, Queensland, Australia. In the 2021 census, Holland Park West had a population of 6,468 people.

== Geography ==
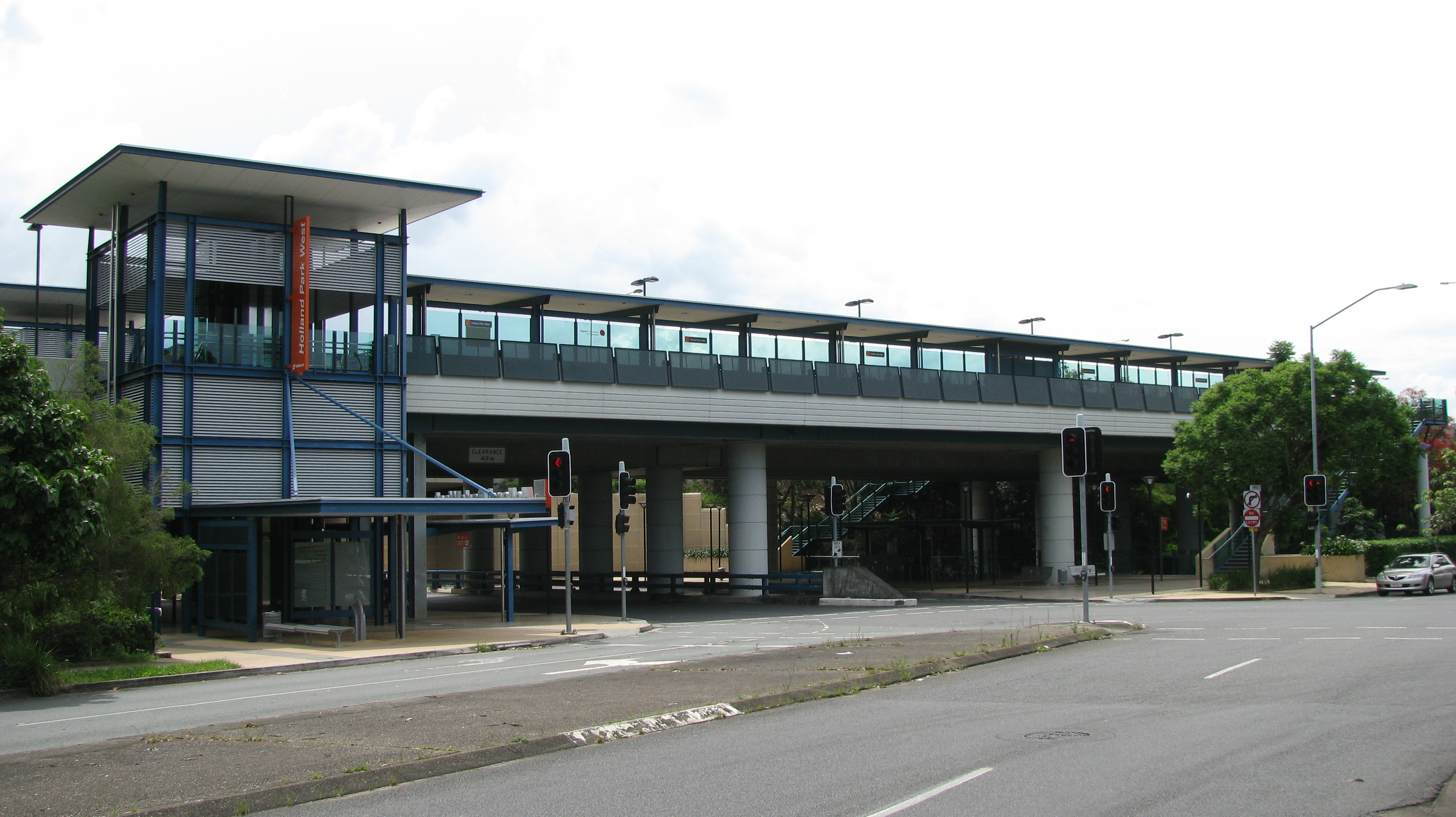
Holland Park West busway station, 2010

Holland Park West is located to the south-east of the Brisbane central business district between the Pacific Motorway and Logan Road.

The South East Busway passes through the suburb which is served by the Holland Park West busway station (27.5286°S 153.0574°E).

== History ==
The suburb takes its name from the adjacent suburb of Holland Park, which in turn takes its name from the subdivision of land owned by Julius Holland.

In May 1914, on what is now known as Holland Park West, 62 subdivided allotments of 'Hill Farm Estate' were auctioned by G.T. Bell and Chandler and Russell. A map advertising the auction states the Estate was 12 minutes' walk from the Logan Road tram.

In 1926 the Logan Road tramway was extended to a new terminus at Holland Park. Trams commenced operation on the route on Sunday 1 August 1926.

Holland Park Baptist Church opened on Saturday 15 December 1928 by the President of the Baptist Union, Reverend Alfred George Weller. The new church was 30 by 18 feet (9.1 by 5.5 m) and was an old building that they had acquired and removed from another site and reconstructed at 10 Yuletide Street off Logan Road (27.5198°S 153.0609°E). In 1970 a new church building was constructed on the site, with the former church relocated to the rear of the site. The Grace Bible Church which now occupies the site is not affiliated with the Baptist Union.

Marshall Road State School opened on 25 January 1960.

Holland Park State High School opened on 25 January 1971.

Mount Gravatt West Special School was opened on 28 July 1986. On 1 January 2010, it was renamed Nursery Road State Special School. In 2010, the Xavier Special Education Unit of Whites Hill State College in Camp Hill was transferred to Nursery Road Special School. Originally established in 1970 as the Xavier Special School in Coorparoo, the unit was officially merged into Whites Hill State College in 2002, but was never relocated to the college's site in Camp Hill but remained in Coorparoo until its lease expired in 2009, triggering the move to Mount Gravatt West Special School as being better equipped to accommodate Xavier's conductive education methods for children with multiple impairments. As at 2022, Xavier's conductive education methods continue to be an important program at Nursery Road Special School.

== Demographics ==
In the 2011 census, Holland Park West recorded a population of 5,965 people, 50.2% female and 49.8% male. The median age of the Holland Park West population was 35 years of age, 2 years below the Australian median. 73.2% of people living in Holland Park West were born in Australia, compared to the national average of 69.8%; the next most common countries of birth were England 3.1%, New Zealand 3.1%, India 2.1%, China 0.9%, Philippines 0.8%. 81.3% of people spoke only English at home; the next most common languages were 1.6% Greek, 1% Cantonese, 0.8% Punjabi, 0.7% Spanish, 0.5% Italian.

In the 2016 census, Holland Park West had a population of 6,376 people.

In the 2021 census, Holland Park West had a population of 6,468 people.

== Heritage listings ==
There are a number of heritage-listed sites, including:

- Holland Park Hotel (also known as Mountain View Hotel), 935 Logan Road
- Glindemann Farmhouse (also known as Glindemann's Highfield Dairy), 1118 Logan Road
- former Tram Shelter No. 3 (also known as Bus shelter shed), outside 1167 Logan Road (27.5284°S 153.0707°E)
- St Joachim's Catholic Church, 41 Yuletide Street

== Education ==
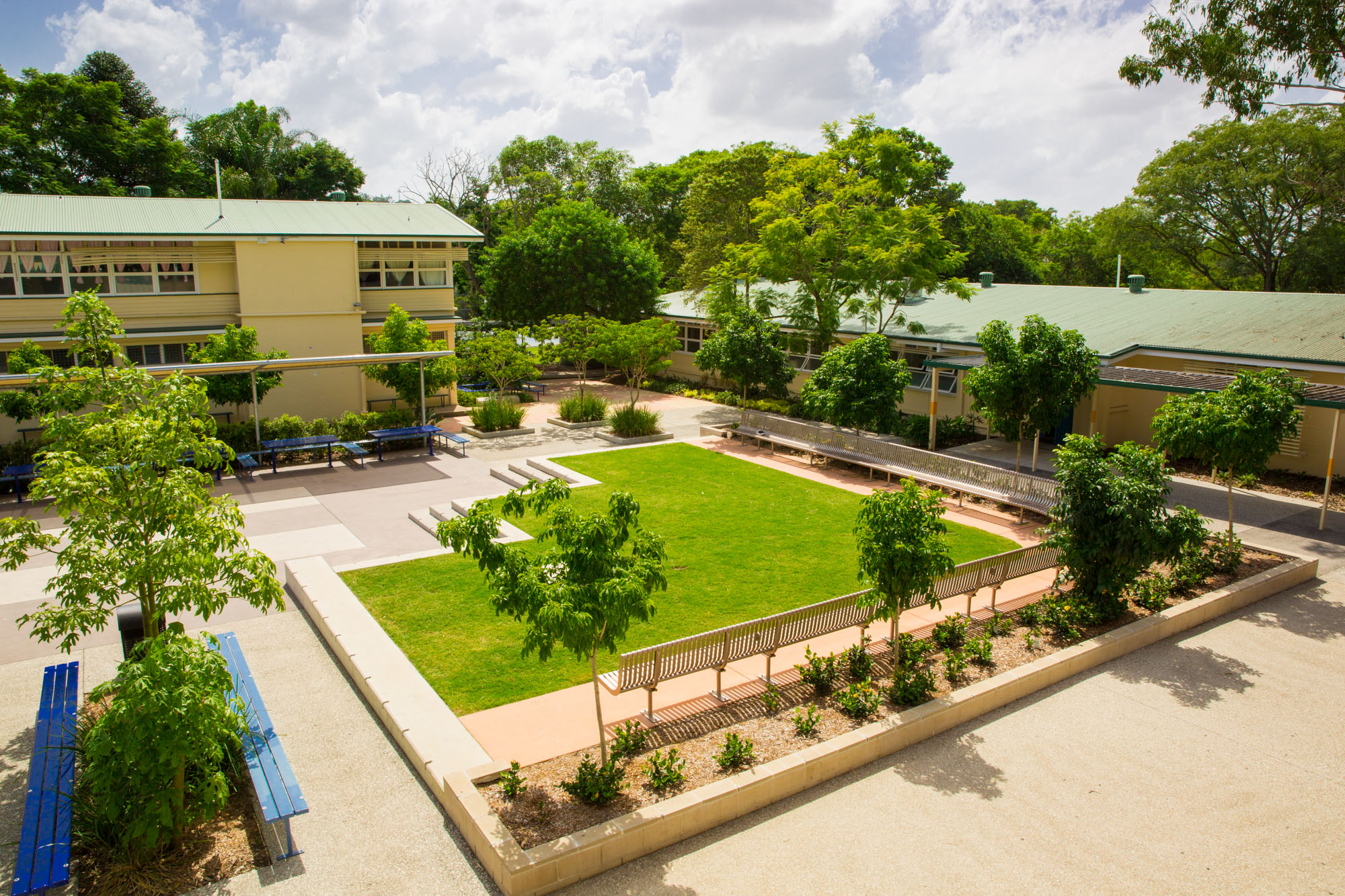
Holland Park State High School, 2015

Marshall Road State School is a government primary (Prep–6) school for boys and girls at Kurts Street (27.5252°S 153.0584°E). In 2018, the school had an enrolment of 492 students with 40 teachers (33 full-time equivalent) and 19 non-teaching staff (14 full-time equivalent). It includes a special education program.

Holland Park State High School is a government secondary (7–12) school for boys and girls at Bapaume Road (27.5309°S 153.0594°E). In 2018, the school had an enrolment of 607 students with 60 teachers (52 full-time equivalent) and 32 non-teaching staff (18 full-time equivalent). It includes a special education program.

Nursery Road State Special School is a special school primary and secondary (Early Childhood to Year 12) school for boys and girls at 49 Nursery Road (27.5341°S 153.0641°E). In 2018, the school had an enrolment of 150 students with 53 teachers (46 full-time equivalent) and 76 non-teaching staff (47 full-time equivalent). It provides special education including an early childhood development program.
