= Ross Clark (poet) =

Australian poet (born 1953)

- Born: 30 August 1953 (age 73); Toowoomba, Queensland, Australia
- Education: Mount Gravatt State High School; University of Queensland
- Occupation: Poet
- Writing career
- Notable awards: Centenary Medal (2003)

Ross Clark (born 30 August 1953) is an Australian poet. His poems often use strongly physical imagery and he is a strong exponent of haiku poetry.

== Life ==
Born in Toowoomba, Clark attended Mount Gravatt State High School and the University of Queensland. He spent over a decade teaching in rural and regional communities. In recent years he has specialized in teaching poetry and creative writing at Queensland University of Technology, as well as performing as a musician.

== Critical recognition ==
In 1990, Clark was an inaugural member of the Queensland Writers Train; in 2003 he was recipient of the Centenary of Federation Medal, otherwise known as the Centenary Medal, for "contribution to poetry"; in 2004 he was recipient of the Queensland Writers' Centre Johnno Award, "for outstanding contribution to Queensland writers and writing"; and in 2008 he was recipient of the Australian Book Review Poetry Prize.

== Works ==
- 1982. Chameleon: Triprych 1-33. Brisbane: Queensland Community Press
- 1986. With Fires on Every Horizon. Kelvin Grove: Brisbane College of Advanced Education. ISBN 978-0-86856-654-2
- 1997. Wishbones & windfalls. Flaxton: Post Pressed. ISBN 978-0-9586571-3-6
- 2001. Remix: Poems Ancient and Modern. Flaxton: Post Pressed, ISBN 978-1-876682-25-5
- 2007. Salt Flung into the Sky. Charnwood: Ginninderra Press. ISBN 978-1-74027-436-4
