= Mount Gravatt State School =

Primary school in Queensland, Australia

Location
- 1263 Logan Road, Mount Gravatt, Queensland, Australia; 27.5327°S 153.0741°E

Information
- School type: Public, coeducational
- Motto: Nothing but the Best
- Established: 1874
- Principal: Louise Hart
- Enrolment: 275 (2023)
- Colors: Yellow; White; Black
- Website: Official site

Mount Gravatt State School is a public co-educational primary school located in the Brisbane suburb of Mount Gravatt, Queensland, Australia. It is administered by the Queensland Department of Education, with an enrolment of 275 students and a teaching staff of 21, as of 2023. The school serves students from Prep to Year 6.

It has been placed on the Brisbane Heritage Register as a Local Heritage Place since 1 January 2004, due to being the first school within the district.

== History ==
The school opened on 29 June 1874 as a Provisional School at 1263 Logan Road due to it, at the time, being located centrally for the then local farming community of the region. The school had 30 foundation students. By 1894, it was classified as a state school due to enrolment numbers being of the required amount to be classified as one by the Department of Public Instruction (the Education Department).

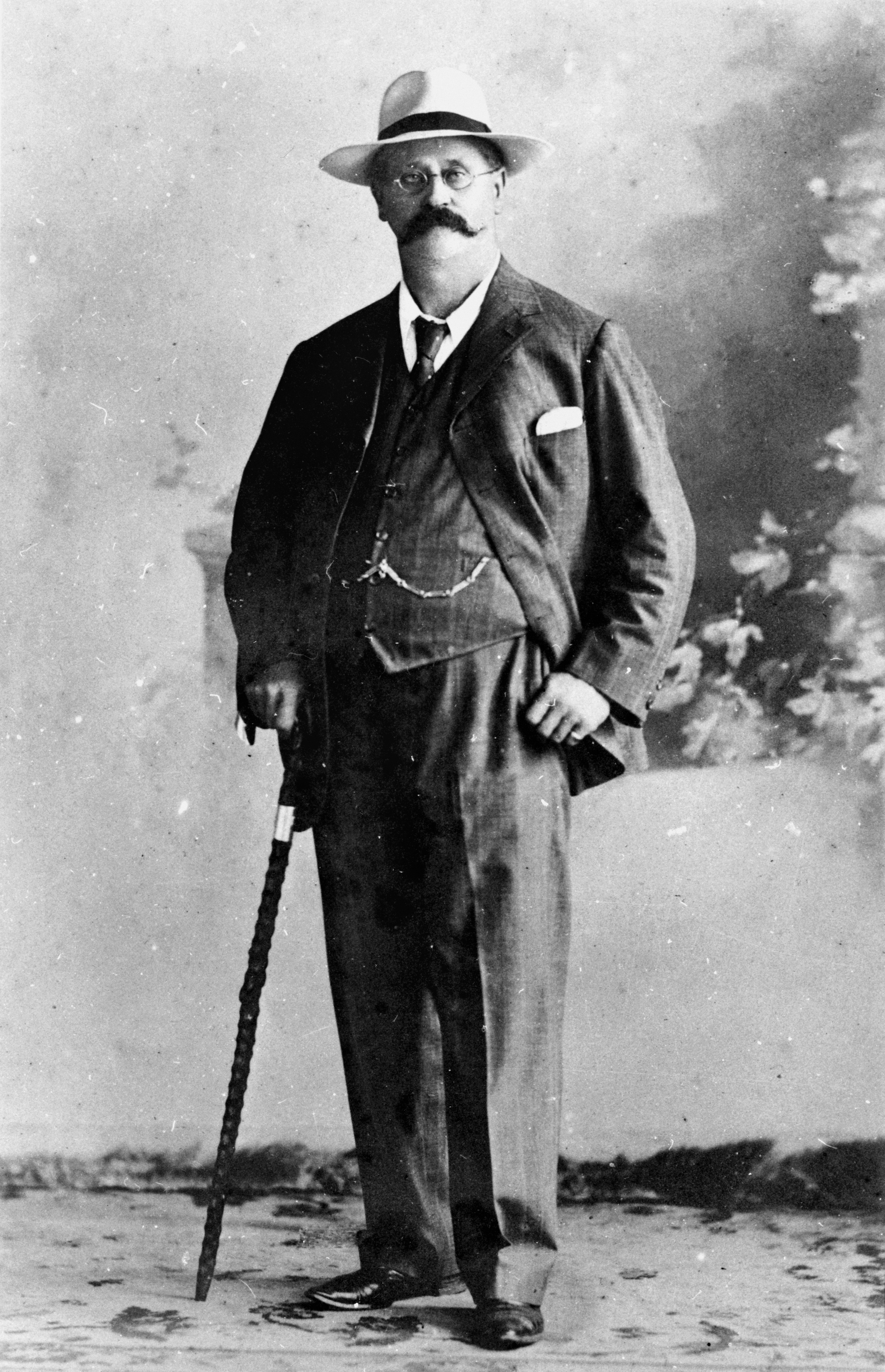
Samuel Jackson, headmaster from 1880 to 1916.

The original school building was a slab hut, with a teacher's residence; its associated detached kitchen and both a buggy and play shed were added to the site soon thereafter.

On 8 May 1896, the school community came together and celebrated Arbor Day by planting trees around the school grounds.

In 1901, the teacher's residence was transformed into the Infant's school building, and headmaster Samuel Jackson relocated to a nearby cottage on land owned by Amandus von Senden. Mr. Samuel Jackson was the headmaster from 1880 until his death in 1916; he died by either heart failure or drowning while bathing on 25 December 1916.

The number of enrolments had increased significantly following World War I, enough so to outstrip the facilities of the school. The local community and school staff advocated strongly for the construction of a new school; however, this would not become a reality until 1930. On 13 June 1930, the Education Department purchased land surrounding the site for the school to expand. The very same year, three classrooms and an office for the headmaster were constructed, while a fourth classroom was added in 1933 and Electric lighting being installed in 1934, despite the Great Depression occurring during this time. Another significant enrolment increase would occur following World War II, with the school having only 112 students in 1945 to having 1,005 by 1959 and 1,660 by 1972. The school's enrolment has since decreased to 275 students, as of 2023.

The original school building was moved to the Mt Gravatt Showgrounds during the school's expansion in 1930 and was demolished by Brisbane City Council in 1974, while the Infants school (previously the teacher's residence) was moved and became a private dwelling at 99 Dawson Road. The detached kitchen became part of the residence at 28 Invermore Street.

In 1973, the school received $20,098 for external painting as part of a million-dollar school building and housing programme.

In 2013, a man died at the school on election day after acting aggressive towards electoral officials and being detained by the police.

The school celebrated its 150th anniversary in 2024.

== Demographics ==
In 2021, the school had a student enrolment of 241 with 20 teachers (17 full-time equivalent) and 16 non-teaching staff (9 full-time equivalent). Female enrolments consisted of 123 students and Male enrolments consisted of 118 students; Indigenous enrolments accounted for a total of 6% of total enrolments and 49% of students had a language background other than English.

In 2022, the school had a student enrolment of 251 with 21 teachers (17 full-time equivalent) and 15 non-teaching staff (9 full-time equivalent). Female enrolments consisted of 129 students and Male enrolments consisted of 122 students; Indigenous enrolments accounted for a total of 6% of total enrolments and 44% of students had a language background other than English.

In 2023, the school had a student enrolment of 275 with 21 teachers (17 full-time equivalent) and 17 non-teaching staff (9 full-time equivalent). Female enrolments consisted of 134 students and Male enrolments consisted of 141 students; Indigenous enrolments accounted for a total of 5% of total enrolments and 45% of students had a language background other than English.

== Heritage listing ==
The Brisbane City Council listed the school on the Brisbane Heritage Register as a Local Heritage Place on 1 January 2004, with the citation being created in January 2010. Even though the school was listed in 2004, and the citation was created in 2010, the significance of the school is assessed under the local heritage criteria, which is based on the Brisbane City Plan 2014.

It follows three of the criteria, these being the historical significance (Criterion A), representation of the local area (Criterion D) and social significance (Criterion G).

=== Criteria A – Historical significance ===
To meet the historical significance criteria, the site should illustrate its role in shaping the region's evolution and historical patterns. It meets this guideline due to it providing a reminder of the need for educational institutions for the district's early residents.

=== Criteria D – Representation ===
To meet the representation criteria, the site should signify its importance in showcasing the cultural characteristics of the region. This criterion is met due to the school buildings being built during the era of the Great Depression.

=== Criteria G – Social significance ===
To meet the social significance criteria, the site should identify that it has a significant connection with local communities and/or there associated cultural groups, either through social, cultural, or spiritual connections. It meets this guideline due to the school being the earliest state school within the region.

== See also ==
- Education in Queensland
- List of schools in Greater Brisbane
