= Mount Thompson (Queensland) =

Mountain in Queensland, Australia

- Location within Queensland

Highest point
- Listing: List of mountains in Australia
- Coordinates: 27°31′45″S 153°04′43″E

Geography
- Location: Queensland, Australia

Mount Thompson is a mountain in Brisbane, Queensland, Australia. It is within the suburbs of Mount Gravatt East and Holland Park.

It is well known within Brisbane because Queensland's first crematorium (and only crematorium until the 1970s), Mount Thompson crematorium, was built on its north-west slope in 1934.
