= Clairvaux MacKillop College =

Catholic secondary school in Queensland, Australia

Location
- Upper Mount Gravatt, Queensland; Australia; 27°33′12.67″S 153°04′40.31″E

Information
- Type: Co-educational, secondary, Catholic
- Motto: By Effort and Faith
- Established: 1986, from the amalgamation of Clairvaux College and MacKillop Catholic College
- Principal: Wayne Chapman
- Enrolment: 1300
- Colours: Maroon, gold and white
- Website: www.cvxmck.edu.au

Clairvaux MacKillop College is a Roman Catholic co-educational secondary school located in Upper Mount Gravatt, a suburb in the south side of Brisbane, Queensland, Australia. With a student body of over 1300, the school was founded in 1986 by the amalgamation of Clairvaux College and the MacKillop Catholic College.

== History ==
Clairvaux College was founded by the Christian Brothers in 1966 as a Catholic all-boys secondary school with Brother Surawski as principal. In 1971 it was decided that the all-girls Catholic secondary school St Joseph's College be moved from its current location in Holland Park to the site adjoining Clairvaux College and be renamed Mackillop College. Sister Margaret Mary Campbell was the first principal. Both schools operated as separate colleges until 1984, with some sharing of classes, teaching staff, and sports facilities. A decision was made to amalgamate the two colleges and full integration occurred in 1988 with the co-educational school renamed to Clairvaux MacKillop College.

== House system ==
The students are divided into the following 6 houses:

- Aspinall (Orange): Named after Father Kevin Aspinall, PP.
- Campbell (Yellow): Named after Sister Margaret Mary Campbell, first principal of Mackillop. (formally O'Donnell)
- Chisholm (Green): Named after Caroline Chisholm. (formally Penola)
- MacKillop (Red): Named after Mary MacKillop. (formally Duhig)
- Rice (Blue): Named after Edmund Rice.
- Surawski (Purple): Named after Brother Surawski, the first principal of Clairvaux College.

The house system was expanded in 1995 and the six houses participate in fund raising for selected charities, vie in three inter-house sporting events annually and come together as a united college for inter-school sport events.

== Notable alumni ==
- Jim Chalmers, Treasurer of Australia
- Mark Coyne, rugby league player
- Peter Coyne, rugby league player
- Mitchell Kealey, an Australian Olympic long distance runner
- Linus Power, state member of parliament for the Electoral District of Logan
- Darren Smith, a rugby league player. After his rugby career, Smith returned to the school to become a career pathways teacher
- Jason Smith, a rugby league player
- Thomas Bradley, Supreme Court judge and incoming Queensland governor.
