= Mount Gravatt =

- Suburb
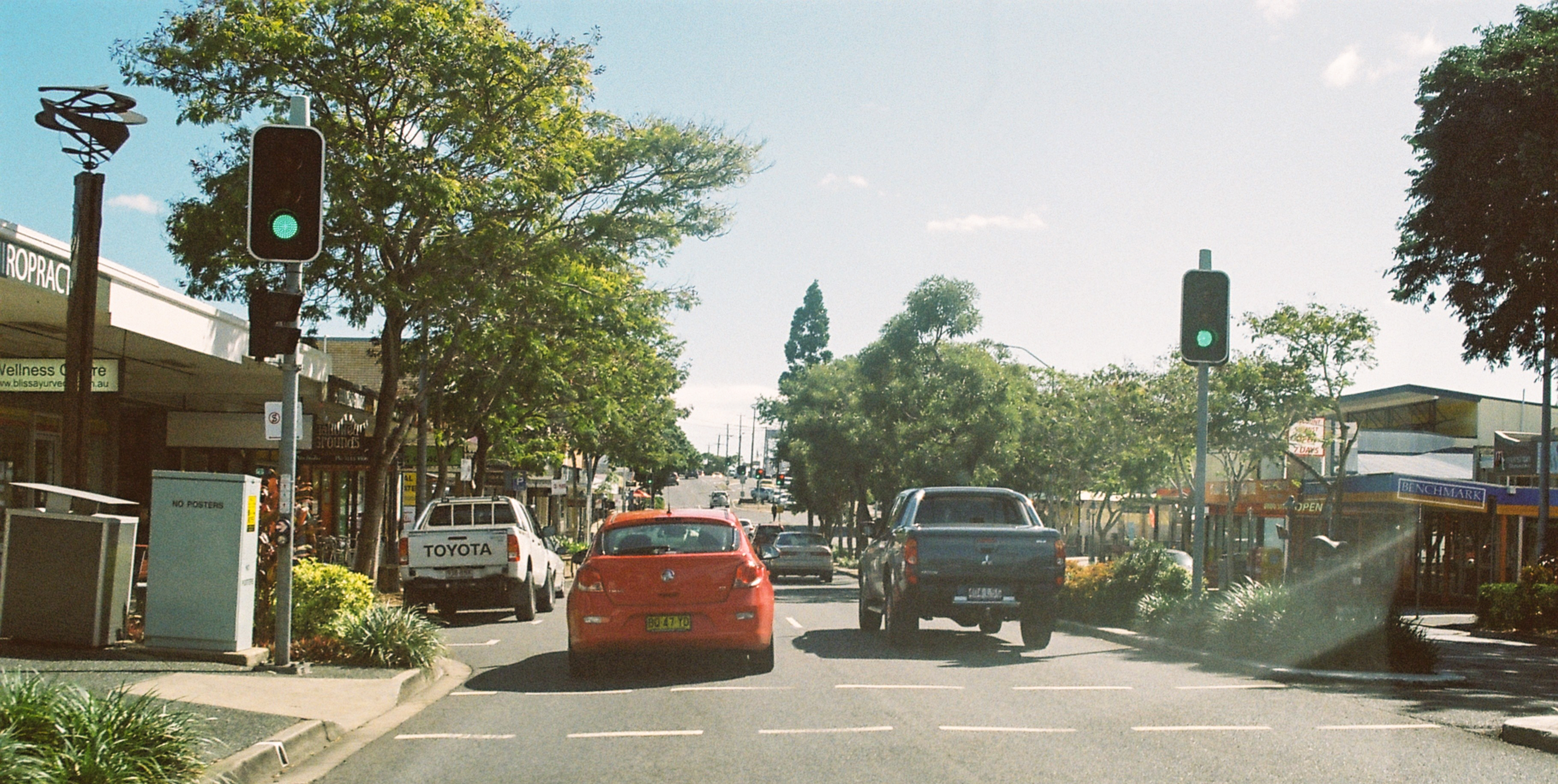
- Mount Gravatt Central, Logan Road (27.538°S 153.0792°E)

- Interactive map of Mount Gravatt
- Coordinates: 27.5402°S 153.0722°E
- Country: Australia
- State: Queensland
- City: Brisbane
- LGA: City of Brisbane (Holland Park Ward)
- Location: 10.4 km (6.5 mi) SSE of Brisbane

Government
  - State electorates: Greenslopes; Mansfield
  - Federal division: Bonner

Area
  - Total: 3.0 km^{2} (1.2 sq mi)

Population
  - Total: 3,733 (2021 census)
  - Density: 1,244/km^{2} (3,220/sq mi)
- Time zone: UTC+10:00 (AEST)
- Postcode: 4122
Suburbs around Mount Gravatt
| Holland Park West | Holland Park | Mount Gravatt East |
| Tarragindi | Mount Gravatt | Mount Gravatt East |
| Nathan | Upper Mount Gravatt | Upper Mount Gravatt |

Mount Gravatt is a southern suburb of the City of Brisbane, Queensland, Australia and a prominent hill and lookout within this suburb (27.5428°S 153.0728°E). In the 2021 census, Mount Gravatt had a population of 3,733 people.

== Geography ==
The suburb is situated in the south-east of the city and was one of Brisbane's largest. This was before it was divided into Mount Gravatt East, Upper Mount Gravatt and Mount Gravatt South; the last being renamed Wishart in the early 1990s.

== History ==
Prior to European settlement in the 19th century, Mount Gravatt was inhabited by the Indigenous Yuggera and Turrbal peoples for thousands of years, and is known as kagarr-mabul, kaggur-mabul, caggara-mahbill, or kaggur-madul, which means "place of echidnas" in the local Indigenous dialect.

The hill was named Mount Gravatt in 1840 by surveyor Robert Dixon after Lieutenant George Gravatt who was the commander of the Moreton Bay penal colony from May to July 1839. Gravatt was later transferred to India where he died in 1843.

Mount Gravatt State School was opened on 29 June 1874.

In 1888, 3 sections of 107 allotments, 6 and 7 acres were advertised to be auctioned on 24 November as 'The Abdington Estate Mount Gravatt'.

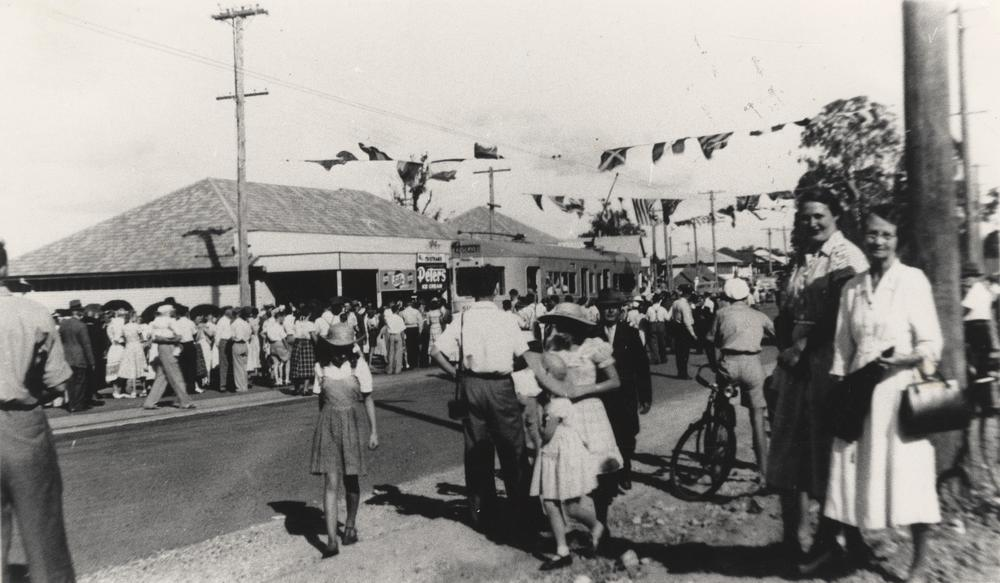
Crowd observing the first tram through the suburb in 1951

Between 1953 and 1969 electric trams ran from the suburb into Brisbane's Central Business District (CBD) along Logan Road. As Mount Gravatt was the end of the line, part of the area was known locally as "The Terminus".

Mount Gravatt East State School (in neighbouring Mount Gravatt East) was opened on 29 August 1955.

Mount Gravatt State High School opened in 1960.

St Agnes Catholic Primary School opened on 1 January 1962.

The Mount Gravatt Library opened in 1967.

St Catherine's School (in neighbouring Wishart) opened on 4 March 1971.

Mount Gravatt Special School opened on 17 May 1971. On 21 September 2012, it was relocated Mackenzie State Primary School (which was formerly Mount Petrie State School in Mackenzie) where it was renamed Mackenzie Special School.

Griffith University (in neighbouring Nathan) opened its main campus in 1975.

Yarranlea State School opened in Yarranlea (in the Toowoomba Region) on 22 January 1883 and closed on 9 December 1977. In 1979 it was relocated to Mount Gravatt College of Advanced Education (a teacher training institution) as a museum school. It was then relocated to the Griffith University campus and reopened on 27 January 1987, known as Old Yarranlea State School) to provide teacher training in a one-teacher school environment (typical of schools in many regional communities of Queensland).To that end, enrolments in the school were limited to 18 students. However, the school was closed at the end 2013 due to having fewer than 150 students and being within five kilometres of three state schools. Due to the support of parents and the public, it reopened as Yarranlea Primary School (an independent school) in July 2014.

Circa 1975, the suburb was populated by middle class, young families seeking stability.

== Demographics ==
In the 2011 census, Mount Gravatt had a population of 3,238 people, 50.9% female and 49.1% male. The median age of the Mount Gravatt population was 36 years, 1 year below the national median of 37. 71.7% of people living in Mount Gravatt were born in Australia. The other top responses for country of birth were New Zealand 3.2%, England 3.1%, India 2.1%, China (excludes SARs and Taiwan) 1.0% and South Africa 1.0%. 81.9% of people spoke only English at home; the next most common languages were 1.1% Arabic, 1.0% Mandarin, 1.0% Punjabi, 0.7% Greek and 0.7% Italian.

In the 2016 census, Mount Gravatt had a population of 3,366 people, 51.2% female and 48.8% male. The median age of the Mount Gravatt population was 36 years, 2 years below the national median of 38. 68.8% of people living in Mount Gravatt were born in Australia. The other top responses for country of birth were England 3.1%, India 3.1%, New Zealand 2.7%, China (excludes SARs and Taiwan) 1.8% and Korea, Republic of Korea (South) 0.8%. 77.0% of people spoke only English at home; the next most common languages were 1.9% Mandarin, 1.3% Spanish, 1.2% Punjabi,0.9% Korean and 0.8% Japanese.

In the 2021 census, Mount Gravatt had a population of 3,733 people, 51.7% female and 48.3% male. The median age of the Mount Gravatt population was 36 years, 2 years below the national median of 38. 67.9% of people living in Mount Gravatt were born in Australia. The other top responses for country of birth were New Zealand 2.8%, India 2.7%, England 2.5%, China (excludes SARs and Taiwan) 1.8% and the Philippines 1.1%. 74.8% of people spoke only English at home; the next most common languages were 3.1% Mandarin, 1.1% Cantonese, 0.9% Hindi, 0.8% Korean and 0.8% Vietnamese.

== Education ==
Mount Gravatt State School is a government primary (Prep–6) school for boys and girls at 1263 Logan Road (27.5326°S 153.0740°E). In 2017, the school had an enrolment of 231 students with 24 teachers (17 full-time equivalent) and 18 non-teaching staff (11 full-time equivalent). It includes a special education program.

St Agnes School is a Catholic primary (Prep–6) school for boys and girls at 29 Tudor Street (27.5322°S 153.0722°E). In 2017, the school had an enrolment of 312 students with 29 teachers (20 full-time equivalent) and 21 non-teaching staff (11 full-time equivalent).

Yarranlea Primary School is a private primary (Prep–6) school for boys and girls at 176 Messines Ridge Road (27.5399°S 153.0628°E). In 2017, the school had an enrolment of 25 students with 4 teachers (2 full-time equivalent) and 4 non-teaching staff (2 full-time equivalent).

Mount Gravatt State High School is a government secondary (7–12) school for boys and girls at Loreburn Street (27.5350°S 153.0735°E). In 2017, the school had an enrolment of 1196 students with 98 teachers (91 full-time equivalent) and 43 non-teaching staff (31 full-time equivalent). It includes a special education program.

== Facilities ==
The Mount Gravatt Showgrounds are an important centre for cultural and community activities and the site of the annual Mount Gravatt Show, an agricultural fair. The grounds are positioned on Logan Road, opposite the mega-church, Hillsong Brisbane Campus (formerly known as Garden City Christian Church).

The Mount Gravatt Library which is operated by the Brisbane City Council operates is located at 8 Creek Road.

== Sport ==
Mount Gravatt sport includes:

- Easts Mt Gravatt rugby league club.
- Mount Gravatt Australian Rules Football Club in the Queensland State League. The club were premiers in 2007.
- The Mount Gravatt Hawks Soccer Club plays in the Brisbane Premier League.

== Mount Gravatt Lookout ==
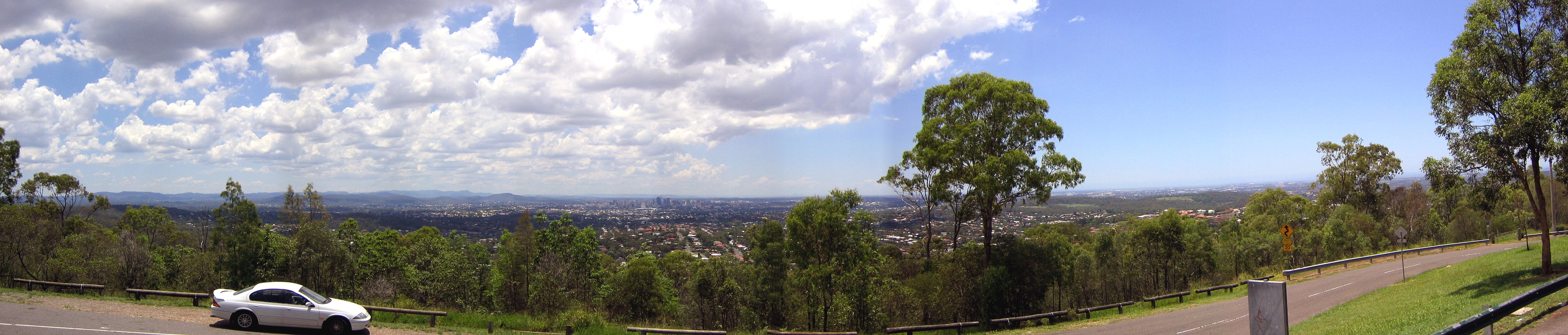
Panorama from Mount Gravatt, looking north to Brisbane

Mount Gravatt Lookout is accessible via Shire Road which winds its way past water towers up to the lookout carpark and a communications tower.

There is a large cave complex located on a walking trail on the southern slope of the mountain (27.5442°S 153.0768°E).

== Transport ==
Since the closure of the tram network in 1969, the public transport has been provided by buses operated by Transport for Brisbane and a local bus company the Mount Gravatt Bus Service. The South East Busway is connected by a service from Mount Gravatt Central to the Busway terminal at Griffith University.
