= Mount Thompson Crematorium =

Crematorium in Brisbane, Australia

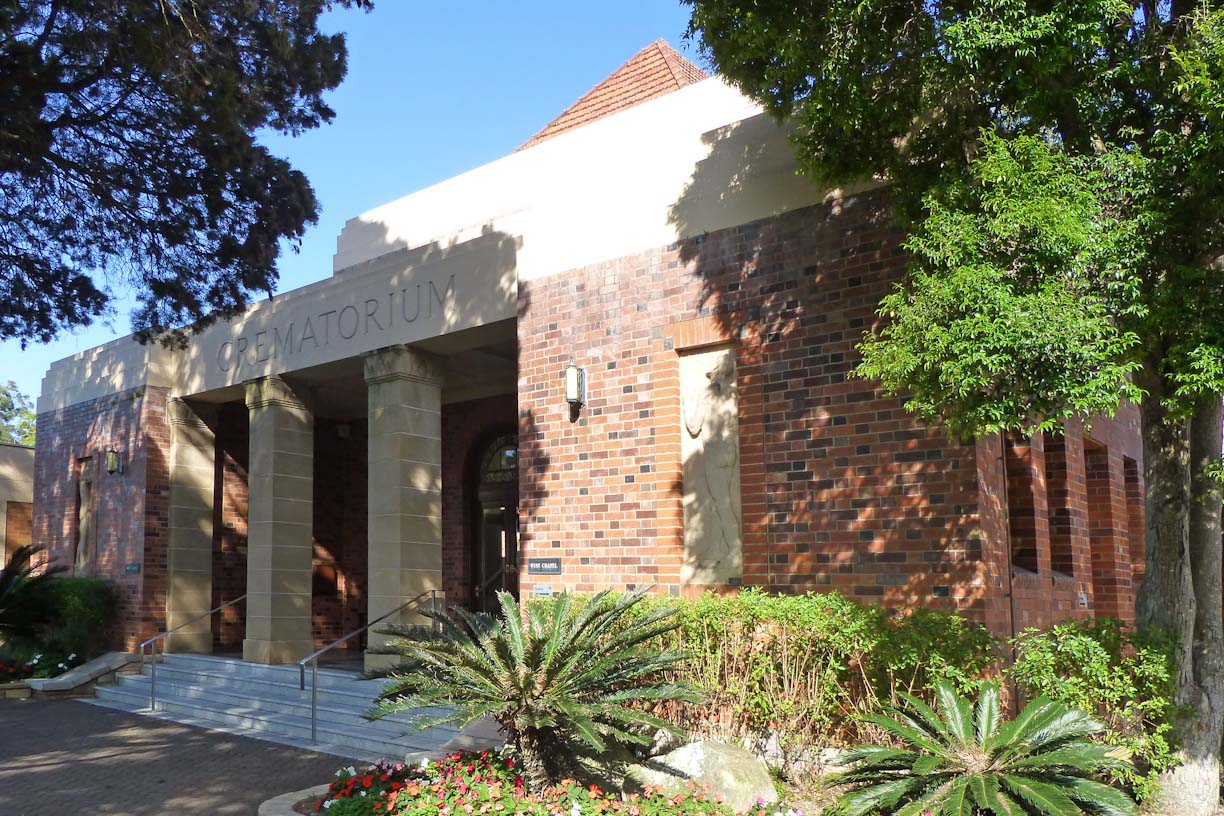
- West Chapel main entrance flanked by Daphne Mayo's relief sculptures of Grief and Hope (1934)
- Interactive map of the Mount Thompson Crematorium area
- Former names: Brisbane Crematorium

General information
- Status: Open
- Location: Brisbane, Queensland, Nursery Road, Holland Park, Australia
- Coordinates: 27.52684°S 153.07667°E

Website
- www.mtthompsoncrem.com.au

Mount Thompson Memorial Gardens and Crematorium (formerly Brisbane Crematorium) includes a heritage-listed chapel (the West Chapel), columbaria and other features. It is located on north-western slopes of Mount Thompson in Brisbane, Australia. The street address is Nursery Road in Holland Park. It was established in 1934 as the first crematorium in Queensland.

== History ==
The crematorium was the first in Queensland and was constructed after many decades of lobbying and public discussion, culminating in a group of citizens meeting and forming the Brisbane Crematorium Limited in 1930. Shares were sold in the company and a suitable site was purchased in 1933.

Early designs were done by Richard Gailey, Junior (the son and business partner of Richard Gailey). However, Melbourne architects Charles and Frank Heath were appointed as the crematorium designers and worked in partnership with Brisbane architects GHM Addison and Son and HS Macdonald who prepared further plans and specifications.

Proposed but unused plans

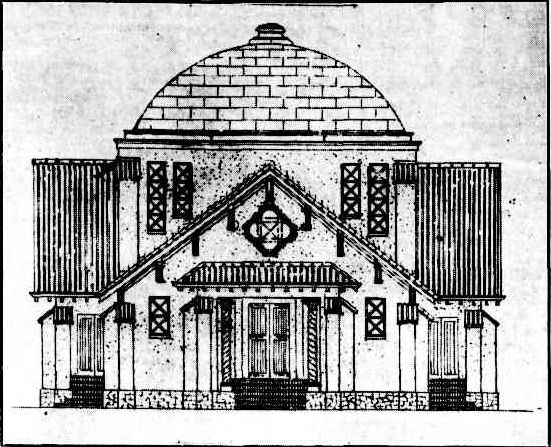
Mount Thompson Crematorium, early proposed plans for front elevation, 1932.

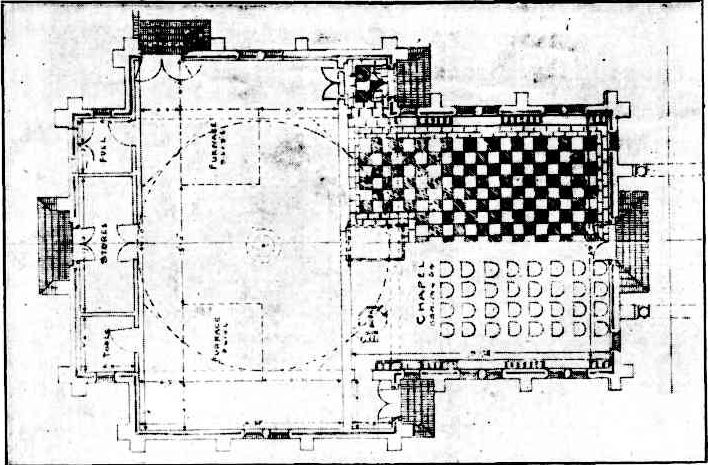
Mount Thompson Crematorium, early proposed ground plan, 1932

Artist William Bustard was engaged to work on a canvas mural representing the awakening from death which was positioned over the catafalque in the chapel.

Sculptor Daphne Mayo was commissioned to create three relief works, Grief and Hope for the front facade and one of a boy scattering seed, representing the continuation of life, for the original columbarium.

Crematorium artworks

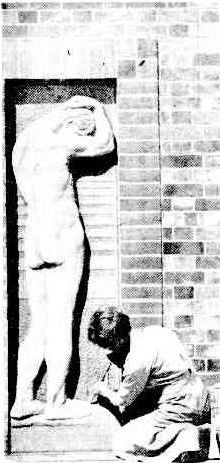
Daphne Mayo working on the sculpture Grief for the Mount Thompson crematorium (1934)

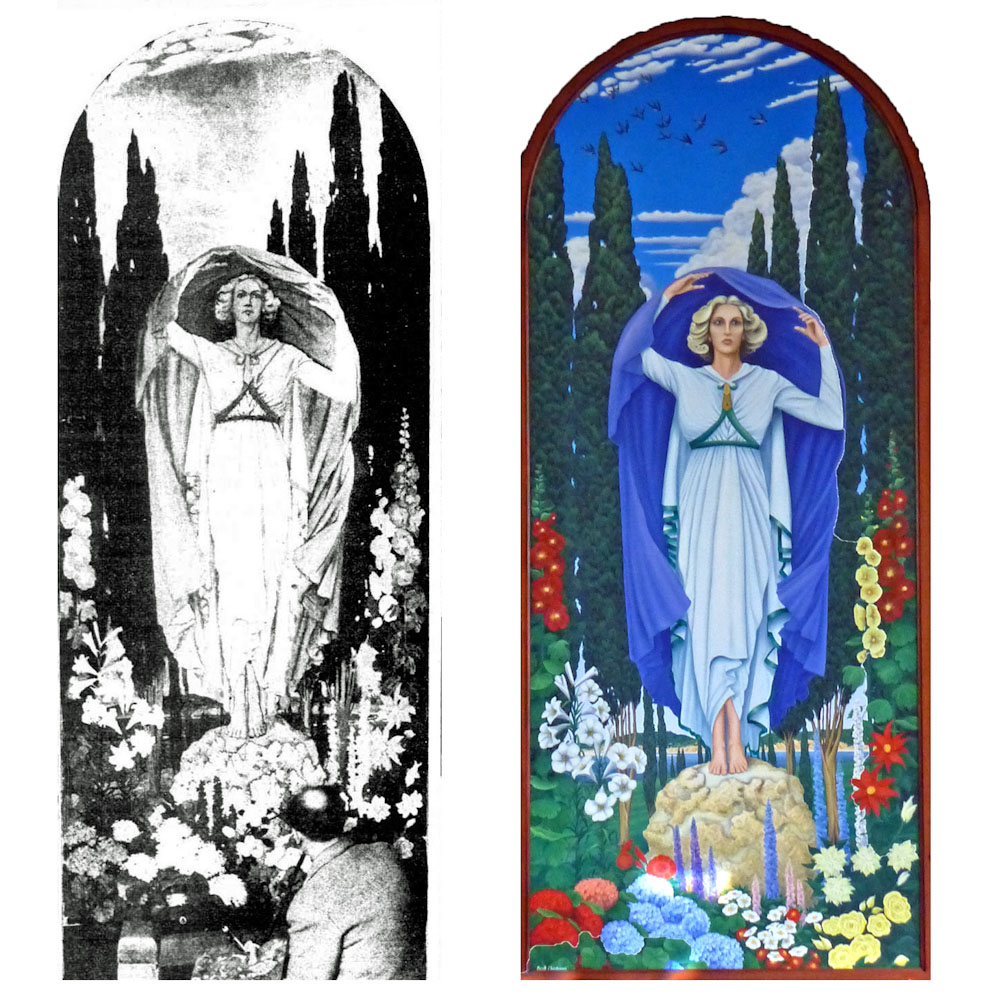
Awakening from death (aka Lifting the veil of convention)

Left: Original mural on canvas being worked upon by William Bustard in 1934 at the Crematorium

Right: Reproduction of mural by Scott Christensen (2008)

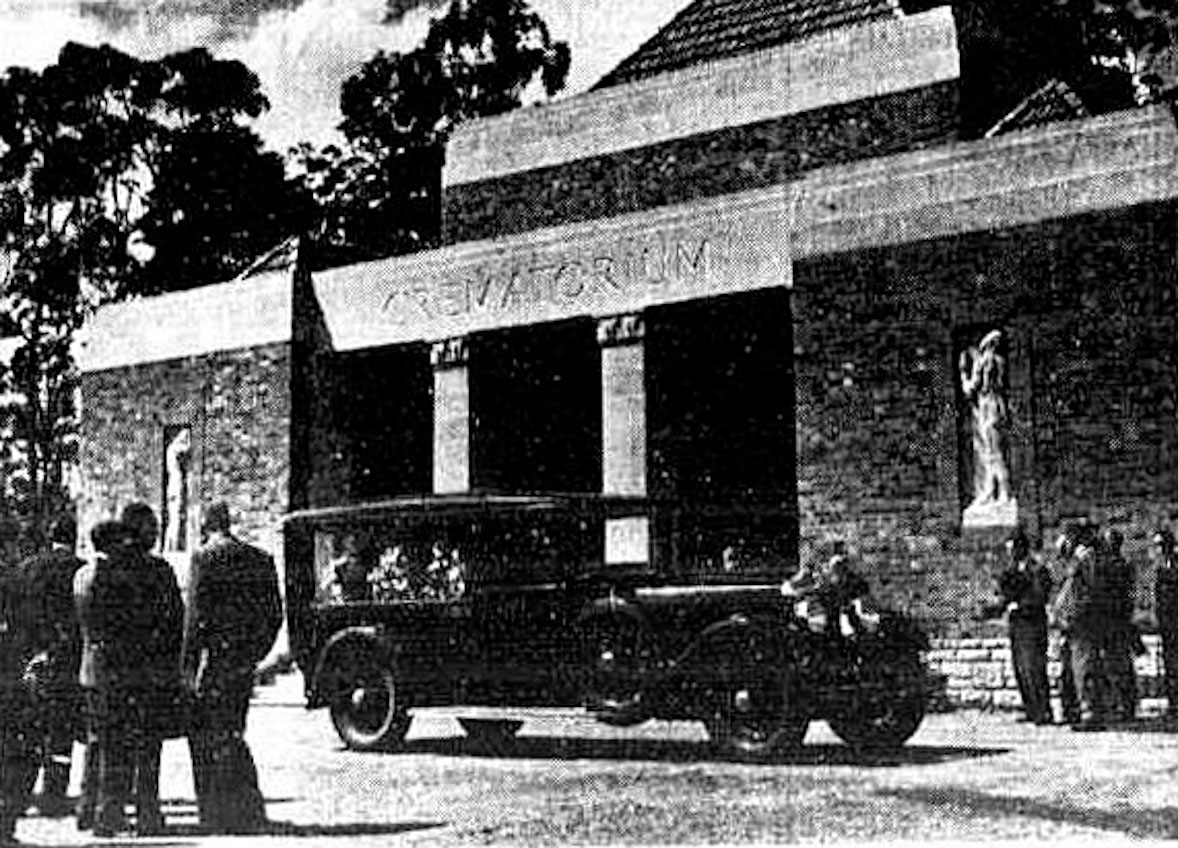
The first cremation service 11 September 1934

Mount Thompson Crematorium officially opened on Sunday 9 September 1934. The first cremation service was held on the morning of 11 September 1934. A religious service for Neil Richmond Rose of Wynnum, Queensland was held at 10.30am followed by a non-religious one for Ernest Charles Fletcher of Ularunda Station, central Queensland at 2.30pm.

During the Second World War, there were 88 Australian service personnel cremated here whose remains rest at the crematorium and are commemorated by Commonwealth War Graves Commission (CWGC) memorial here. Another 36 Australian service personnel cremated here whose remains were scattered or buried at places where CWGC commemoration was not possible are commemorated on the CWGC's Queensland Cremation Memorial in Lutwyche Cemetery. They included First World War fighter ace Roy Phillipps who was killed flying while serving in the Royal Australian Air Force in 1941. In addition a Royal Australian Artillery soldier cremated here is, exceptionally, commemorated on the Victoria Cremation Memorial in Melbourne.

Sir Arthur Fadden, 13th Prime Minister of Australia (1941), was cremated here in 1973., as was Frank Cooper, 26th Premier of Queensland (1942-1946) in 1949.

Over the years further columbaria and gardens were constructed, adjacent land acquired and facilities expanded. By 1962 an additional chapel had been built, designed by Adrian Pooley. The new chapel was designated the East Chapel and the original, the West Chapel.

Renowned architect Karl Langer received commissions in the 1960s to design a number of new columbaria and to modify the West Chapel including new pews, kneeling rails, a new marble lined pulpit and removal of Bustard's original mural with reworking of the walls and catafalque surrounds.

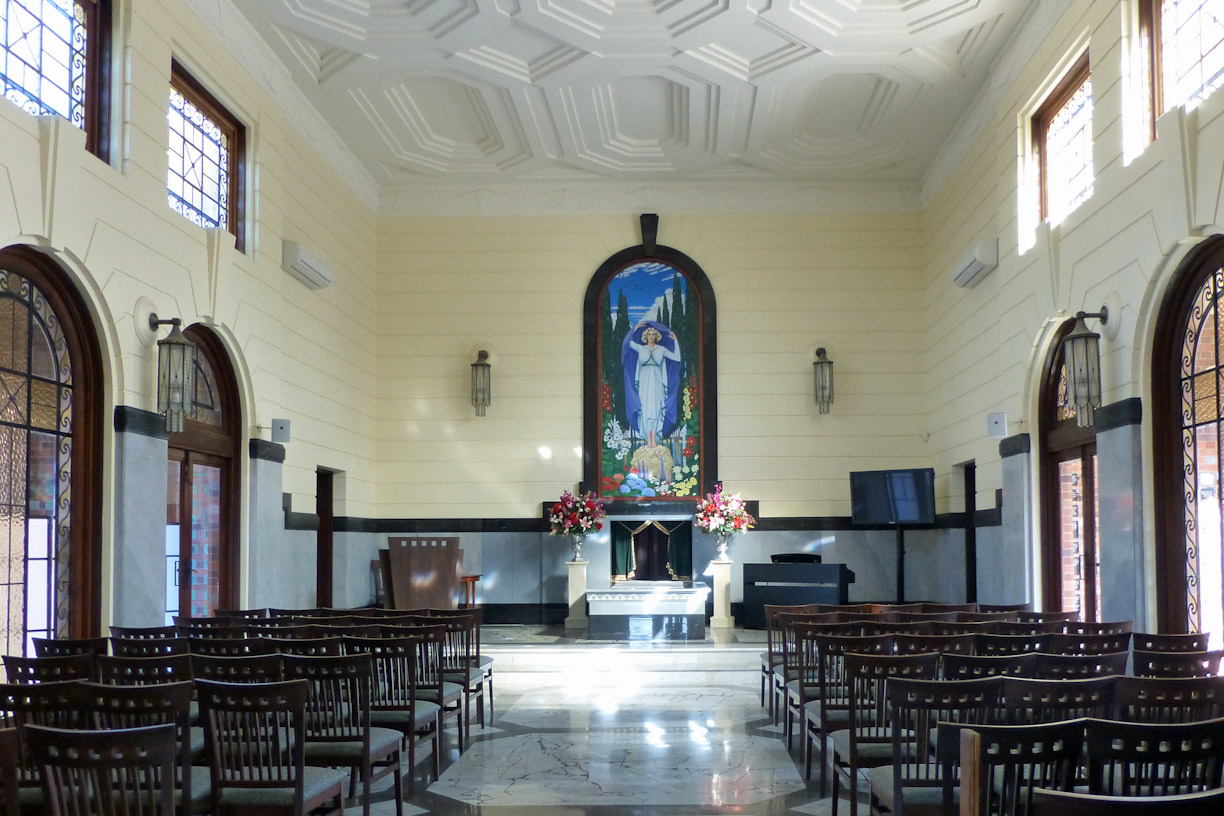
West Chapel interior 2015

The West Chapel underwent five months restoration commencing in 2007 and reopening in February 2008. The chapel was returned to its original configuration with removal of pews and installation of single chairs as well as restoration of terrazzo flooring, lead lighting and the catafalque and its surrounds. A reproduction by Scott Christensen of William Bustard's original mural painting was also commissioned and installed.

The East Chapel was also refurbished in the 2000s with modern lighting, podium work and contemporary seating installed.

== Description ==
The original 1934 crematorium building is art deco in style. It is a brick structure with stone facings including a portico flanked with stone pillars. It included originally a chapel, mortuary, retort room, columbarium garden, pond and offices. Large arched openings overlook a columbarium garden and pond. The walls of the chapel are lined with a dado of Queensland marble in black and dove grey. The floor is terrazzo with marble borders.

== Heritage listing ==
The crematorium is listed on the Brisbane Heritage Register.
