= George Gravatt =

British Army officer

Lieutenant George Gravatt (1815–1843) was an officer in the British Army. In May 1839, he succeeded Sir Sydney Cotton as commander of the Moreton Bay penal settlement in what is now Brisbane, Queensland, Australia. He held the position for three months.

Gravatt was born in Woolwich in London in 1815.

His service in the Moreton Bay penal settlement is remembered in the naming of Mount Gravatt, a mountain and suburb in Brisbane.

Gravatt was transferred with his regiment, the 28th Foot Regiment, to Karachi India, where he died in 1843.
