= Holland Park, Queensland =

Suburb of Brisbane, Queensland, Australia

Holland Park
- Suburb
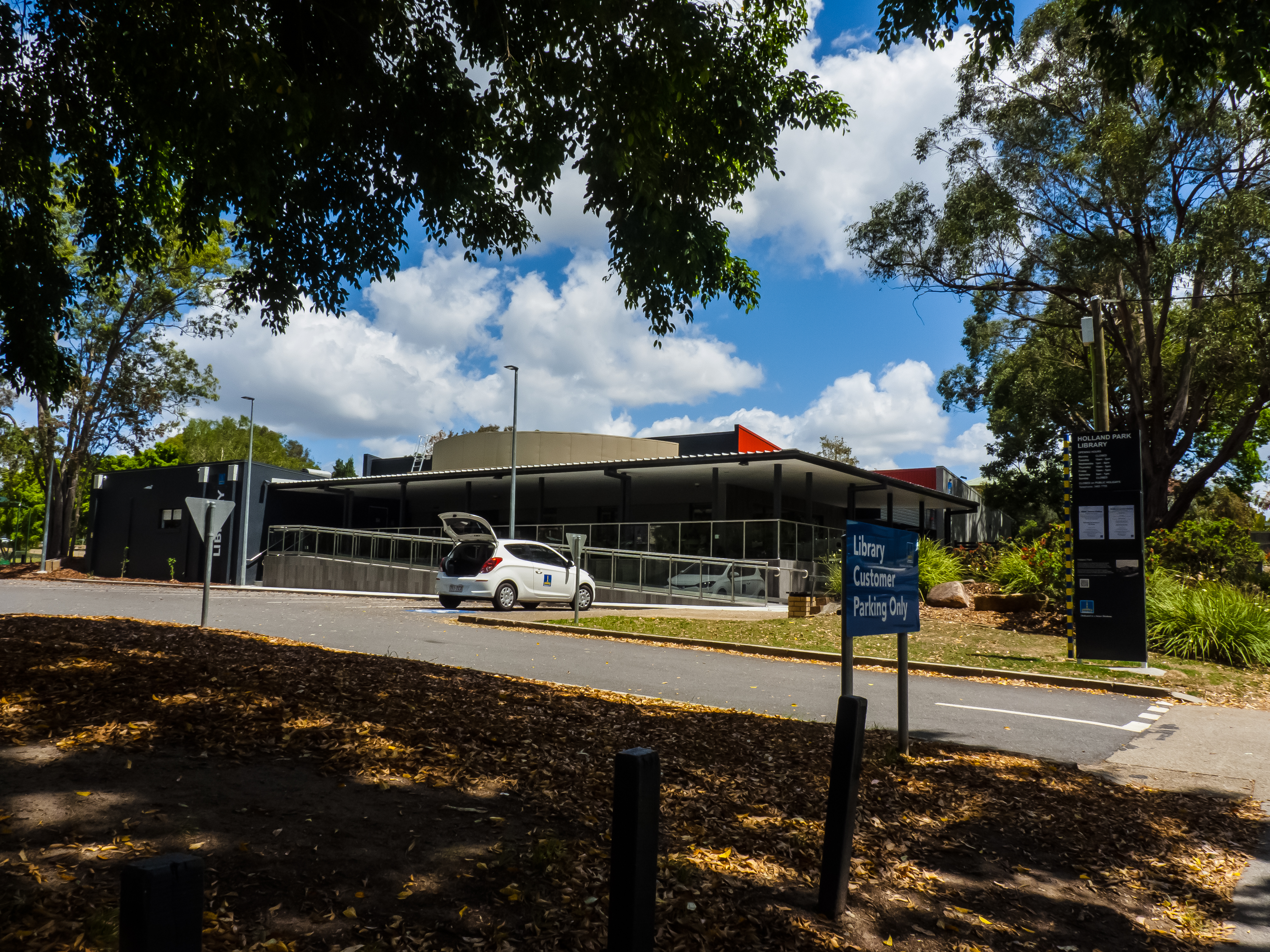
- Seville Road Library

- Interactive map of Holland Park
- Coordinates: 27.5194°S 153.0727°E
- Country: Australia
- State: Queensland
- City: Brisbane
- LGA: City of Brisbane (Holland Park Ward)
- Location: 9.3 km (5.8 mi) SE of Brisbane CBD
- Established: 1865

Government
  - State electorate: Greenslopes
  - Federal divisions: Griffith; Bonner

Area
  - Total: 3.1 km^{2} (1.2 sq mi)

Population
  - Total: 8,671 (2021 census)
  - Density: 2,800/km^{2} (7,240/sq mi)
- Time zone: UTC+10:00 (AEST)
- Postcode: 4121
Suburbs around Holland Park
Greenslopes	Coorparoo	Camp Hill; Carina Heights
Holland Park West	Holland Park	Mount Gravatt East
Holland Park West	Mount Gravatt	Mount Gravatt East

Holland Park is a southern suburb in the City of Brisbane, Queensland, Australia. In the 2021 census, Holland Park had a population of 8,671.

== Geography ==
Holland Park is 9.3 kilometres (5.8 mi) by road south-east of the Brisbane GPO. It is mostly residential, with some commercial areas along Logan Road.

Holland Park is an older suburb made of largely post-World War II wooden homes. Logan Road bisects the slightly hilly suburb. There are a number of schools and parks in the suburb and a retail zone with shops and a public bar. It is also home to the Mount Thompson crematorium, Queensland oldest crematorium, in Nursery Road.

== History ==
The Holland Park area was settled from 1865 with the land used mainly used for farming.

Holland Park owes its name to merchant Julius Holland (1844–1884) who, for many years, owned a large area of scrub land which he had bought on speculation. The estate stretched from what is now Abbotsleigh Street to the vicinity of Arnold Street, and from Logan Road back to Cavendish Road.

In the early 1880s, almost 300 First Nations persons from afar as Ipswich would meet on a creek bank in the suburb for a corroboree.

In 1882, Julius Holland sold "Holland Estate". These 150 acres (61 ha) of scrub, in the true sense, was Holland Park proper; but as estates in the vicinity also adopted the Holland Park name, an elastic meaning has been given to the name, and a much more extensive area is now comprehensively known as Holland Park. On Saturday 24 May 1884, the Windsor Castle Estate was auctioned by John F. Buckland. The subdivision consisted of 217 allotments. The subdivision "commanding view of the city and the whole of the surrounding country from bay to the city". Tarana Estate was auctioned on Saturday 20 November 1926 by Blocksidge and Ferguson Ltd. The allotments advertising poster indicates sites have "electric light at the estate. Framont Estate on Logan Road was advertised for auction on 30 Oct 1926, 55 allotments were for sale. Estates had "all perfect building blocks, nice slope, high and breezy, extra large areas, well drained, ideal surroundings, graded and formed roads". Stonehaven Heights Estate centred on Raff Avenue was subject to a private sale on 25 March 1931; the locality had previously been advertised for sale on 28 September 1918.

In 1908, on the peripheral of today's suburb with Mount Gravatt, a mosque was built for 'Brisbane's Mohammedan community'. With its mango trees, it was established by Muslims who had moved from India. The imam of the 1930s, Fazal Abdul, was from Afghanistan, and served mostly the residents of Brisbane, but this was extended to 'Travellers, Indian hawkers, and Afghan bushmen from the far inland, and farmers and storekeepers from the country'.

In 1918, Roman Catholic Archbishop of Brisbane, James Duhig purchased 3 acres (1.2 ha) of land in the Yuletide Estate for a church and school.

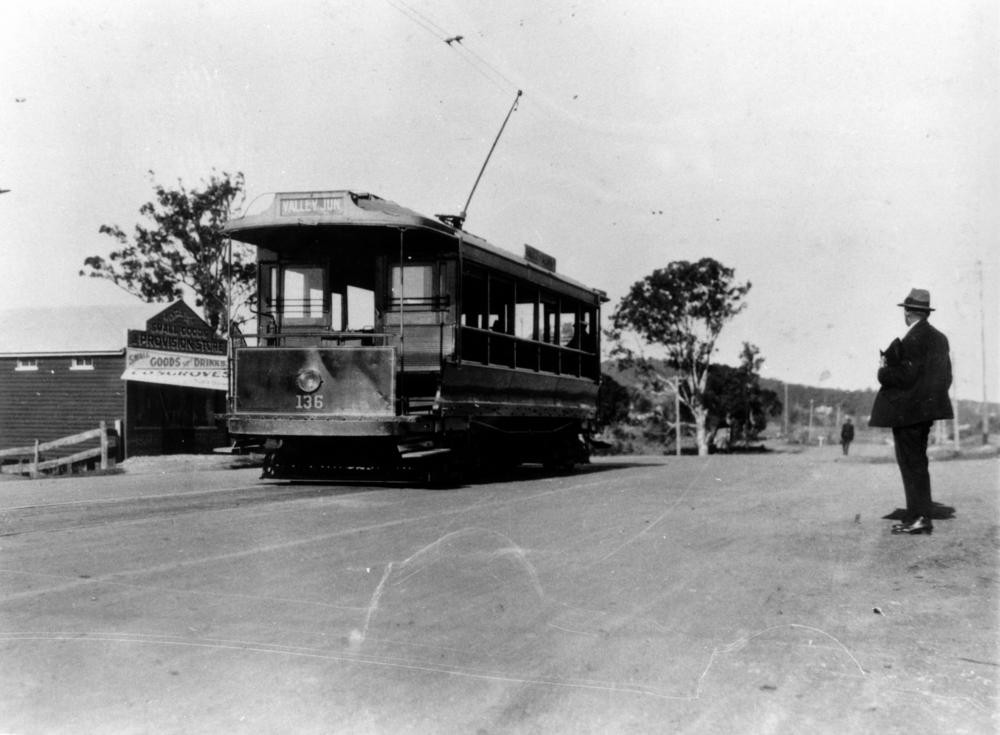
Holland Park tram terminus on Logan Road, circa 1929

The tram line was extended from Stones Corner to Greenslopes in 1914, and in 1926 the Logan Road tramway was extended to a new terminus at Holland Park. Trams commenced operation on the route on Sunday 1 August 1926. In 1930, the tram line was sought to be further extended towards Mount Gravatt. Trams operated by the Brisbane City Council operated along Logan Road until 13 April 1969.

Holland Park Baptist Church opened on Saturday 15 December 1928 by the President of the Baptist Union, Reverend Alfred George Weller. The new church was 30 by 18 feet (9.1 by 5.5 m) and was an old building that they had acquired and removed from another site and reconstructed at 10 Yuletide Street off Logan Road, now in Holland Park West. In 1970 a new church building was constructed on the site, with the former church relocated to the rear of the site. The Grace Bible Church which now occupies the site is not affiliated with the Baptist Union.

Holland Park State School opened on 28 January 1929.

Mount Thompson Crematorium officially opened on Sunday 9 September 1934, Queensland's first crematorium.

Construction of the Catholic school commenced on Sunday 26 July 1936 when Duhig placed the foundation stone for school. On Sunday 1 November 1936 Duhig officially opened Saint Joachim's school, announcing that a brick church would soon be built alongside the school. The school commenced operation on 1 February 1938 operated by the Sisters of Saint Joseph. On Sunday 14 March 1937, Duhig opened the presbytery for the church.

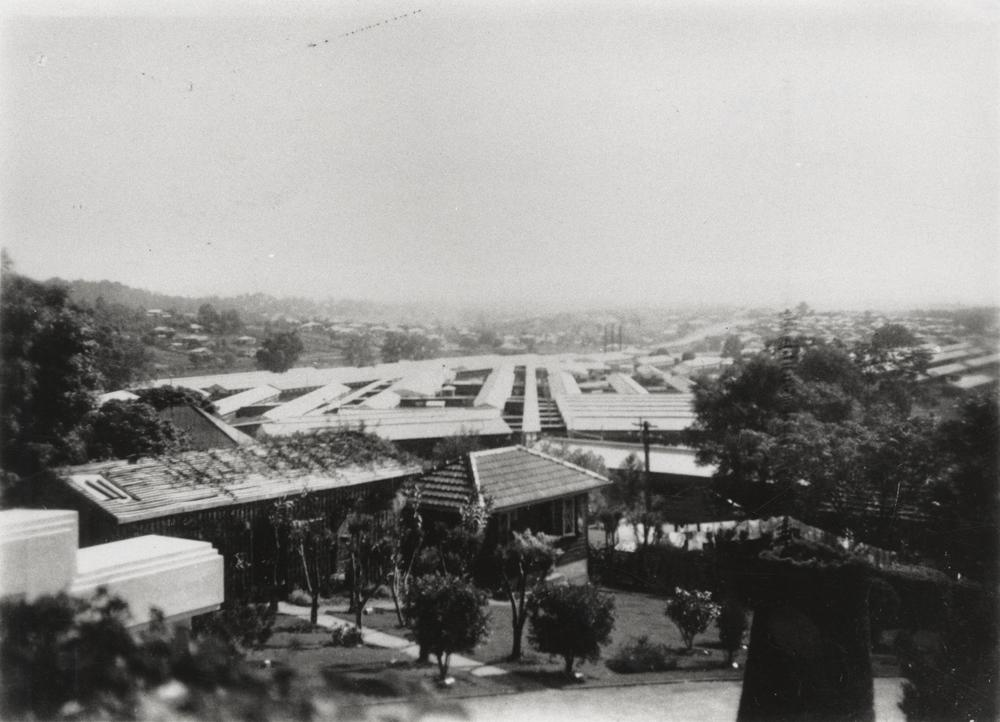
Holland Park Military Hospital on Logan Road, 1945

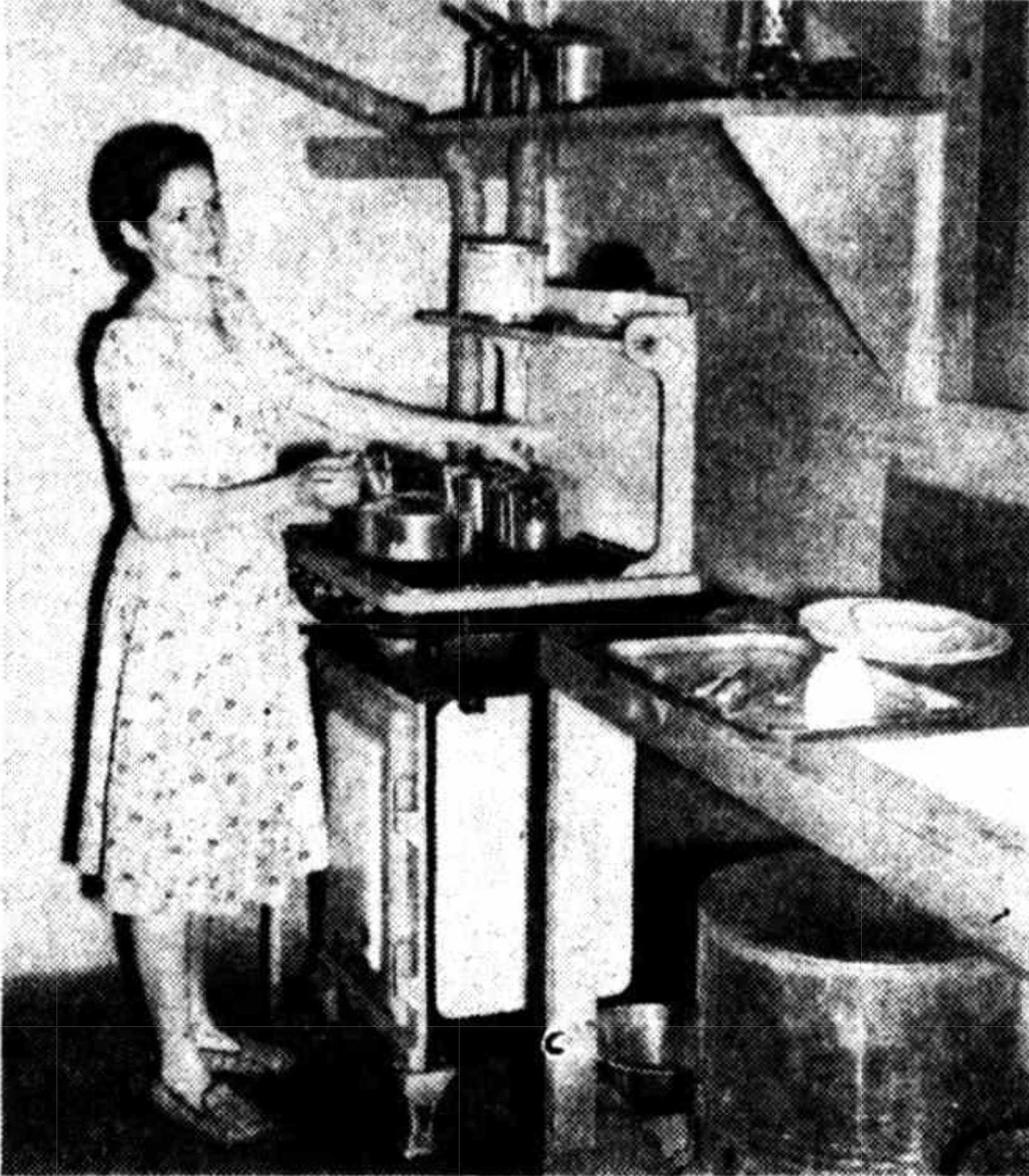
Squatter in US Army huts, Holland Park, 1946

During World War II, the United States Army established the 42nd General Hospital with over 2000 beds on Logan Road in 1942. After the war, Brisbane had a housing shortage and people began squatting in some of the American army hospital huts, then owned by the Australian Government. In 1947, the Queensland Government began to convert the huts to be more suitable for housing and the squatters became official tenants of the Queensland Housing Commission.

After World War II, the area saw heavy residential development. Holland Park Housing Settlement School opened on 27 January 1948. It closed on 22 January 1956 to be replaced by Seville Road State School which opened on 23 January 1956.

In January 1950, residents of one area applied to have the Marshall Road area named Holland Park West.

Cavendish Road State High School opened on 9 April 1951.

Following complaints that police stations were not readily identifiable, the Queensland Department of Works was asked to supply conspicuous illuminated signs showing 'POLICE' in black letters on a white background. On 5 May 1959, a sample illuminated sign was erected at Holland Park police station and with that success, an order was placed with Albert Smith and Son to manufacture these signs.

In 1964, Saint Joachin's Catholic primary school expanded with the opening of a secondary school for girls called Saint Joseph's High School for Girls. The secondary school opened with 93 girls under the direction of principal Sister Margaret Mary Campbell assisted by Sister Pius Cassidy and Sister Mary Rose. In 1970 Saint Joseph's relocated to Klumpp Road, Mount Gravatt and was renamed McKillop College after Sister Mary McKillop, the founder of the Sisters of Saint Joseph's. McKillop College was neighbour to Clairvaux College, a Catholic secondary school for boys. In 1988, the two schools were amalgamated into secondary co-educational school named to Clairvaux MacKillop College.

The Holland Park Library opened in 1980 with a major refurbishment in 2015.

== Demographics ==
In the 2021 census, Holland Park had a population of 8,671. The median age of the population was 37. 75.2% of people living in Holland Park were born in Australia, compared to the national average of 69.8%. The other most common countries of birth were England (3.0%), New Zealand (2.6%), India (0.9%), Philippines (0.8%), and China (0.7%). 81.6% of people only spoke English at home, while the next most commonly spoken languages were Mandarin (1.3%), Spanish (1.0%), Greek (0.9%), Arabic (0.9%), and Korean (0.8%). The largest religious group is No Religion at 42.0%, followed by Catholic (25.3%), Anglican (8.3%), Not stated (5.2%) and Islam (2.8%).

In the 2016 census, Holland Park had a population of 8,111. The median age of the population was 35. 75.4% of people living in Holland Park were born in Australia, compared to the national average of 66.7%. The other most common countries of birth were New Zealand (2.9%), England (2.7%), India (1%), China (0.9%) and Philippines (0.6%). 81.1% of people only spoke English at home, while the next most commonly spoken languages were Mandarin (1.2%), Greek (1.1%), Somali and Arabic (0.9%) and Spanish (0.8%). The largest religious group is No Religion at 31.3%, followed by Catholic (28.2%), Anglican (10.4%), Not stated (8.4%) and Uniting Church (3.6%).

The 2011 census recorded 7,849 residents in Holland Park, of whom 52% were female and 48% were male. The median age of the population was 35; two years younger than the Australian median. 77.3% of people living in Holland Park were born in Australia, compared to the national average of 69.8%. The other most common countries of birth were England (3.2%), New Zealand (2.9%), India (0.9%), Somalia (0.7%), and Scotland (0.6%). 85.1% of people only spoke English at home, while the next most commonly spoken languages were Greek (1.2%), Somali (1.1%), Spanish (0.9%), Arabic (0.8%), and Hindi (0.7%).

== Heritage listings ==
There are a number of heritage-listed sites in Holland Park, including:

- 137 Abbotsleigh Street: Holland Park State School
- 141 Abbotsleigh Street: Sir William Flood Webb's House
- 35 Berkeley Street: Malouf Residence
- 309 Nursery Road: Brisbane Mosque
- 329 Nursery Road: Mount Thompson Memorial Gardens & Crematorium
- Outside 695 Cavendish Road (27.5180°S 153.0747°E): former trolleybus shelter
- Outside 830 Logan Road (27.5153°S 153.0567°E): former tram shelter
- 20 Percival Terrace: Catt's House
- 30 Percival Terrace: John Kindler's House
- 20 Wilbur Street: Mathers' House

== Education ==
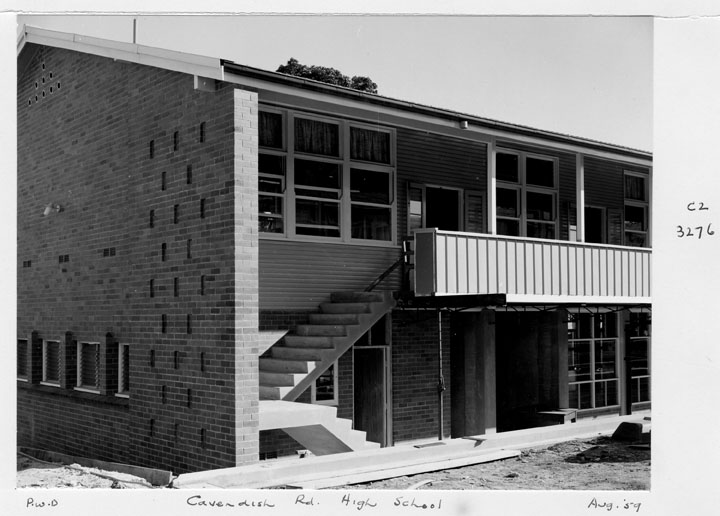
Cavendish Road State High School, August 1959

Holland Park State School is a government primary (Prep–6) school for boys and girls at 59 Abbotsleigh Street (27.5137°S 153.0628°E). In 2017, the school had an enrolment of 853 students with 62 teachers (49 full-time equivalent) and 41 non-teaching staff (23 full-time equivalent).

Saint Joachim's School is a Catholic primary (Prep–6) school for boys and girls at 41 Yuletide Street (27.5206°S 153.0589°E). In 2017, the school had an enrolment of 303 students with 24 teachers (19 full-time equivalent) and 19 non-teaching staff (8 full-time equivalent).

Seville Road State School is a government primary (Prep–6) school for boys and girls at the corner of Oates Avenue and Roscoe Street (27.5255°S 153.0728°E). In 2017, the school had an enrolment of 130 students with 16 teachers (13 full-time equivalent) and 9 non-teaching staff (5 full-time equivalent). It includes a special education program.

Cavendish Road State High School is a government secondary (7–12) school for boys and girls at the corner of Cavendish and Holland Roads (27.5168°S 153.0729°E). In 2017, the school had an enrolment of 1688 students with 126 teachers (117 full-time equivalent) and 55 non-teaching staff (35 full-time equivalent). It includes a special education program.

== Amenities ==
The Brisbane City Council operates a public library at 81 Seville Road.
