= Mount Gravatt State High School =

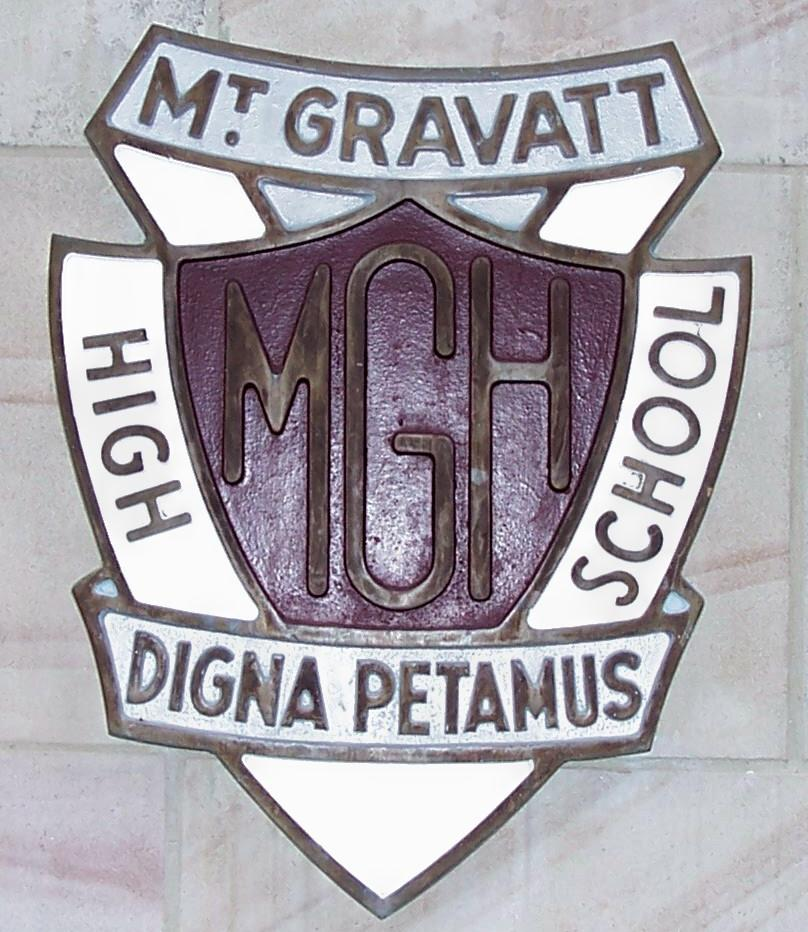

Location
- Mount Gravatt, Queensland, Queensland; Australia; 27°32′24″S 153°4′4.8″E

Information
- Type: State High School
- Motto: Digna Petamus (Seek Worthy Things)
- Established: 1960
- Principal: Andrew Beattie
- Years taught: Years 7–12
- Enrolment: 1200
- Colours: White, black & red
- Mascot: MGH Dragons
- Website: Official Homepage

Mount Gravatt State High School is a co-educational government secondary school of about 1200 students in Mount Gravatt, a suburb in the south of Brisbane, Australia. The school was opened in 1960.

Mount Gravatt State High School is a Registered Training Organization (RTO) and is able to issue Australian Qualification Framework qualifications in the vocational education and training vector and to deliver and/or assess associated training.

The school is an Education Queensland International (EQI) pioneer school for International student programs.

== Gateway school ==
The school is part of the Information and Communication Technology (ICT) Industry Project. As such it can be officially blended (along with five other schools) as ‘Gateway Schools to the ICT Industry’. Schools involved in this project are committed to increasing and improving the various and range of technology in learning. Students are encouraged to develop their learning and stills through the application of appropriate technology in education, as in many other schools.

== Four pillars of learning ==
Mount Gravatt State High follows four “pillars of learning”: academic, cultural, sport, and community.

== Campus ==
The school over the years, has built several buildings, or blocks as denoted by singular letter identification. When the school was founded, the Admin, C Block, & E Block, were the three original buildings to have been built for inaugural class of 1960.

The Administration building houses the main teacher break room, as well as the offices of the Deputy Principals and other important faculty members. It also houses the Student Office, International room, and SC classrooms.

E Block is one of the most recent buildings to have received a renovation. Boasting state of the art technological facilities, this building specializes in subjects such as Digital Tech/Solutions, as well as HPE and other assorted courses. E Block is also one of the original three buildings, with a minor science room outfitted with the necessary equipment and resources also being located there. C Block is denoted as the 'Japanese & Business Class' block. It has several classrooms that are outfitted to teaching those classes, as well as associated courses such as Diploma of Business & Certificate IV in Justice Studies. On the ground floor, it also has several science classrooms, stemming from the buildings original founding status.

G & D Block are buildings pertaining to the studies of Manual Arts (Woodworking etc.) & Home Economics/Arts. They are the first buildings commissioned to the school after the school was built. F block was also built shortly after these two, ultimately being the main building for English, Geography & History.

J block is the main science building, hosting the brunt of most of the equipment and facilities required by classes such as biology, chemistry, physics and general science studies. Neighboring K block, is the Math building. Most, if not all Math classes are undertaking within this building.

L block is the most recently built structure, hosting classes such as Film and Drama. Nearby H block specializes in mainly Music and performing arts.

Finally, the Hall is the largest building. Located just behind the front gate of the school, it is the main building that hosts school parades. It has a fully functional basketball court with retractable hoops and two large fans. It also has a storage room for the much larger instruments that the school band utilize in practice and performances.

== Sport ==
Sport is one of the four major pillars of the values placed on students at MGH. As such, the school has had a long history in both competing and winning in competitions internally, locally, statewide, and sometimes nationally.

=== Sporting Houses ===
Students at Mount Gravatt are placed into four distinct houses at enrollment. Students remain within these houses for however long their enrollment lasts at the school; teachers however, will rotate from year to year to support different houses. The houses are named in honor of the traditional owners of the land on which the school is built on, paying homage and respect to its language and history.

The five house names are as follows:

- Manooka (Red)
- Turramurra (Green)
- Kittani (Blue)
- Attunga (Yellow)

=== Sports carnivals ===
The school hosts three major house carnivals between the four houses. These events are considered mandatory for students to attend.

They are:

- Swimming
- Cross Country
- Athletics

Held annually, these events are designed to maximized for student engagement, as well as foster school spirit and general competitiveness between the students. Points for each house on the day are calculated through four criteria, with most points rewarded from Age Champion downwards:

1. If a student achieves Age Champion.
2. Students that win any event in the top 3
3. Students that participate in any event.
4. Student Attendance Count

The house with the most points will receive that specific event's shield, and have their house name engraved upon in (I.e, Manooka wins the Swimming Carnival Shield).

=== Sporting successes ===
Mount Gravatt High has had numerous successes since its founding in 1960. More recently, the school Futsal teams have found consistent success within the QSF and other associated Futsal School Invitational competitions.

- In 2023, the U14 Girls team 2nd in their conference during QSF.
- In 2023, the U16 Girls team were named the 2023 U16 QSF Champions, defeating Brisbane Adventist College 5–1.
- In 2021, the U16 Boys team were named Champions in the Calamvale Futsal School's Invitational.

== Historical principals ==
Mount Gravatt has gone through a series of principals throughout its existence. Below is a list of them, as well as their tenure length.

- Kevin Sorensen, (2005–2008)
- Ross Robertson, (2019–2023)
- Ross McNichol, (2023–2024)
- Andrew Beattie, (2024–present)

== Notable alumni ==
- Ross Clark – poet
- Simon Shirley – decathlete who competed for England
- Erika Yamasaki – member of Australian weightlifting team at 2006 Commonwealth Games.

== Notable staff ==
- Ian Henderson

== Awards ==
- Comalco – Brisbane's greenest and healthiest school 2005.
- WasteSMART Schools Award – Best Implementation of 'Green' Policies in a SEQ School

== See also ==
- List of schools in Queensland
- Education in Australia
