= Robertson, Queensland =

Robertson
- Suburb
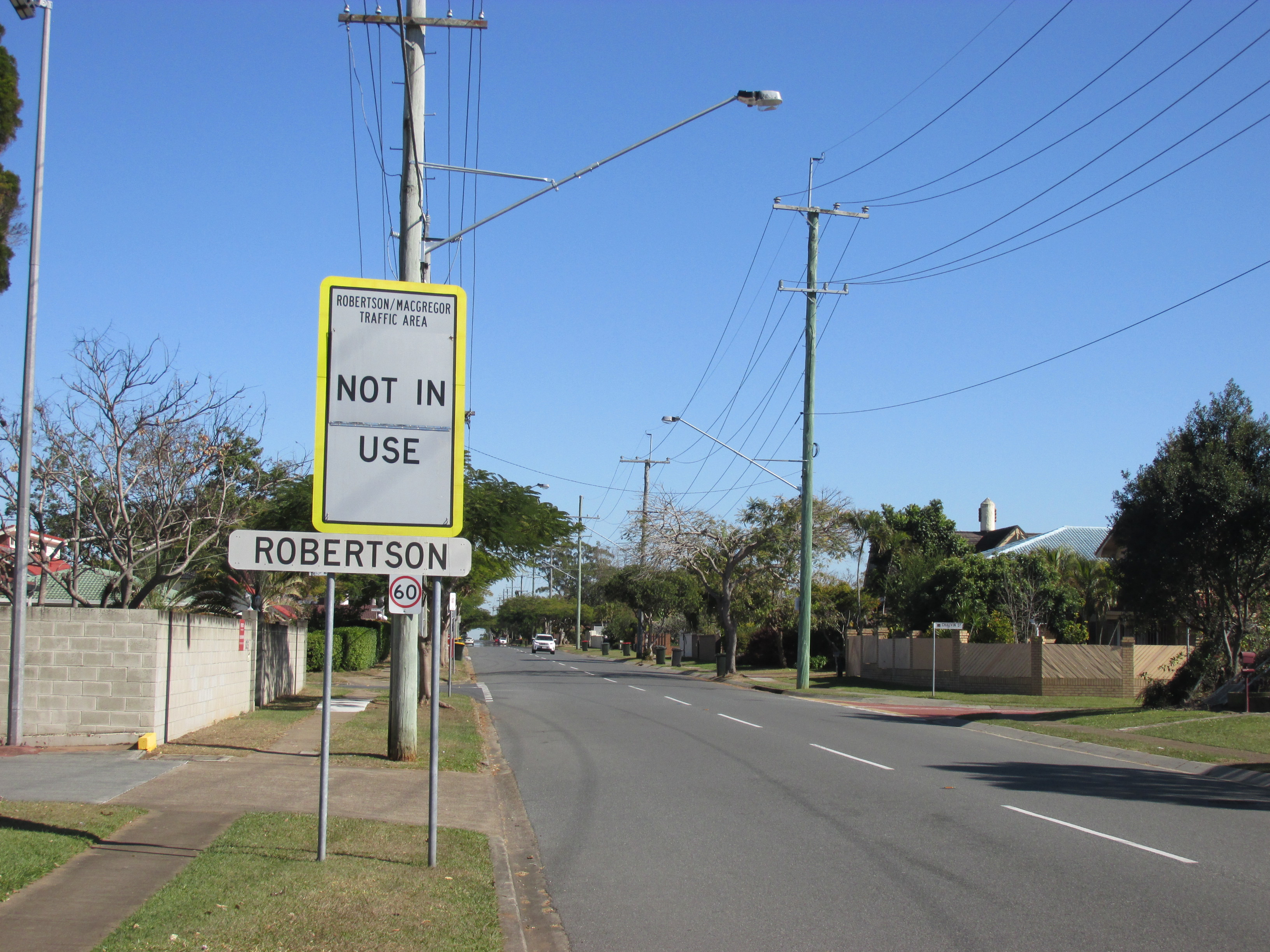
- Robertson sign on Musgrave Road, 2018

- Interactive map of Robertson
- Coordinates: 27.5666°S 153.0563°E
- Country: Australia
- State: Queensland
- City: Brisbane
- LGA: City of Brisbane (MacGregor Ward)
- Location: 13.7 km (8.5 mi) S of Brisbane CBD

Government
  - State electorate: Toohey
  - Federal division: Moreton

Area
  - Total: 1.7 km^{2} (0.66 sq mi)

Population
  - Total: 4,749 (2021 census)
  - Density: 2,790/km^{2} (7,240/sq mi)
- Time zone: UTC+10:00 (AEST)
- Postcode: 4109
Suburbs around Robertson
Nathan	Nathan	MacGregor
Coopers Plains	Robertson	MacGregor
Coopers Plains	Sunnybank	Sunnybank

Robertson is an outer southern suburb in the City of Brisbane, Queensland, Australia. In the 2021 census, Robertson had a population of 4,749 people.

== Geography ==
Robertson is 13.7 kilometres (9 mi) by road (M3 Freeway) south-east of the Brisbane CBD.

Robertson is loosely bounded by Kessels Road to the north, Mains Road to the east, Mccullough Street to the south, and Troughton Road to the west, but excludes the Sunnybank Plaza Shopping Centre to the south-east.

The land use is almost entirely residential.

== History ==
Robertson was named on 1 August 1967 by the Queensland Place Names Board in memory of Doctor William Nathaniel Robertson (1866-1938) who was a member of the University of Queensland Senate. He was also a foundation member of the Royal Australasian College of Surgeons.

In the mid-1960s, Robertson was the unsubdivided southern part of Sunnybank, defined by Musgrave Road and a drive-in picture theatre at the corner of Musgrave and Troughton Roads. A shopping centre, Sunnybank Plaza, was opened in 1975 at the south-east corner of Robertson, and a State primary school in the middle of the suburb was opened in 1980. The population grew more than threefold to over 3000 between 1976 and 1986 as the Nathan campus of Griffith University (1975) developed. The primary school's enrolment topped 600 in 2002.

Sunnybank Plaza was refurbished and enlarged in 1989 and 1995, growing to 30,000 sq metres, with a Kmart, supermarkets, cinemas and 122 other shops.

Robertson State School opened on 29 January 1980 with 124 students. The Robertson State Preschool Centre opened two weeks later with an initial enrolment of 26. The school was officially opened by the Minister for Education, Val Bird, and by 1987 it had 600 students on roll.

== Education ==
=== Robertson State School ===
Robertson State School is a government primary (Prep–6) school for boys and girls at 688 Musgrave Road (27.5654°S 153.0562°E). In 2020, the school had an enrolment of 728 students with 50 teachers (46.3 full-time equivalent) and 31 non-teaching staff (18.4 full-time equivalent). It includes a special education program.

The school is known for its high performing academic results, with a school ICSEA (Index of Community Socio-Educational Advantage) value of 1126 in comparison to the average of 1000. It scores a school ICSEA percentile of 91.

There are a total of 728 enrolments consisting of 355 boys (49%) and 373 girls (51%). 78% of all students have a language background other than English.

=== Secondary schools ===
There are no secondary schools in Robertson. The nearest government secondary schools are Sunnybank State High School in Sunnybank to the south and MacGregor State High School in MacGregor to the east.

== Public Transport ==
The Brisbane City Council bus lines 130 and 140 that pass through Mains Road at the 'Mains Road at Robertson bus stop', operated by Translink, the state public transport operating service, are run on a network of 'no timetable needed' high frequency buses known as Bus Upgrade Zone (BUZ) services.

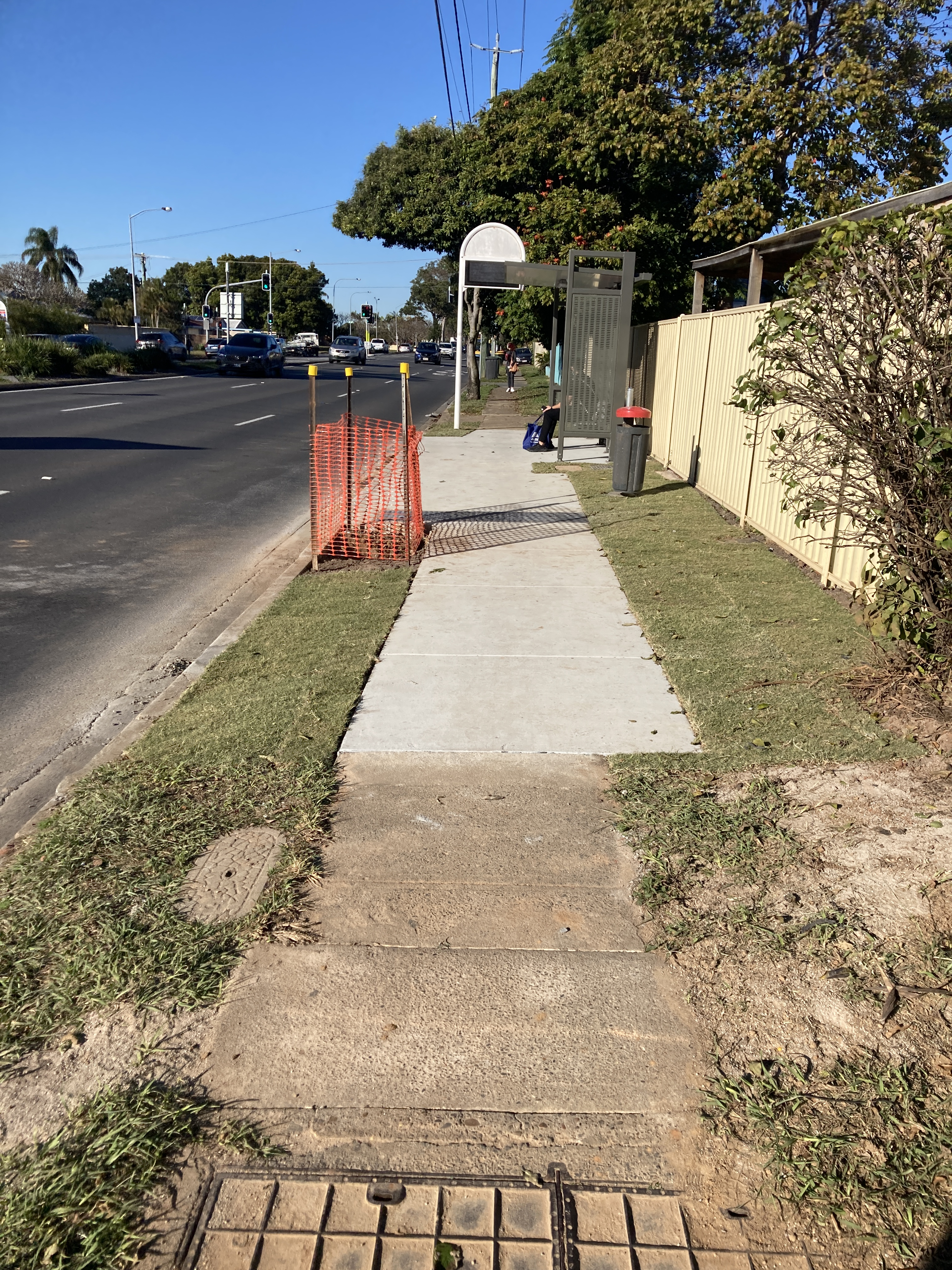
This image represents the Mains Road at Robertson bus stop, servicing the 130, P137, 139, 140, 599 and a few other bus services.

== Demographics ==
Robertson's census populations have been:

Census Date	Population
1976	945
1981	2434
1991	3815
2001	4309
2006	4751
2011	4867
2016	4973
2021	4749

In the 2016 census, Robertson had a population of 4,973 people, 50.1% female and 49.9% male. The median age of people in Robertson (QLD) (State Suburbs) was 32 years. Children aged 0 – 14 years made up 14.0% of the population and people aged 65 years and over made up 15.6% of the population.

In the 2021 census, Robertson had a population of 4,749 people.
