= John Tonge Centre =

Coordinates: 27.5590°S 153.0435°E

The John Tonge Centre - Coronial and Public Health Sciences, Pathology Queensland
- Established: 1992
- Address: 39 Kessels Road
- Location: Coopers Plains, Queensland, Australia
- ZIP code: 4108
- Operating agency: Queensland Health

The John Tonge Centre is the mortuary for Coronial and Public Health Sciences, Pathology Queensland (formerly Queensland Health Scientific Services, formerly Forensic and Scientific Services) and responsible for conducting autopsies in Brisbane (and much of South-East Queensland in Australia) on people whose deaths make them subject to the Coroners Act. Such deaths include accidents, suicides, homicides, deaths during surgery and anything for which a doctor is unwilling to issue a medical cause of death certificate for. In cases when the family is called upon to attend the Centre to identify a loved one support services are generally available. Staff at the mortuary performs some 2,000 autopsies annually and is adjacent to the Queen Elizabeth II Jubilee Hospital on Kessels Road in Coopers Plains.

== History ==
From 1879 until 1992 the Brisbane morgue occupied five different sites on the north bank of the Brisbane River. The building was flooded in 1887, in the 1890 flood it collapsed into the Brisbane River, then in the 1893 flood it was washed away. It was then reconstructed further downstream at Gardens Point. Finally, in 1992 the morgue moved to a purpose built facility at Coopers Plains. The facility was opened officially by the Right Honourable Mr Wayne Goss, Premier of Queensland, on 11 December 1992, and commenced operations on 11 January 1993.
