= Queensland Leptospirosis Culture Collection =

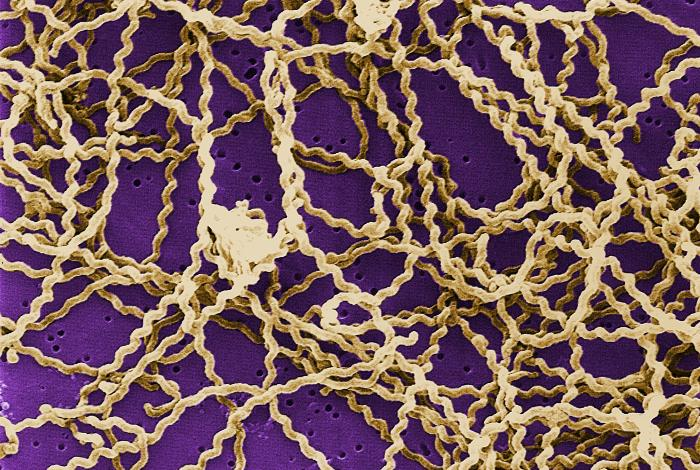
A scanning electron micrograph (SEM) depicts a number of Leptospira sp. bacteria atop a 0.1. μm polycarbonate filter

The Queensland Leptospiral culture collection is a Queensland Government scientific collection, in Australia. The collection is housed at the World Health Organization (WHO) Laboratory for Reference and Research on Leptospirosis, as part of the Forensic and Scientific Services (FSS) provided by Queensland Health.

Leptospirosis is a potentially lethal disease in humans that occurs all around the world (except in polar regions). Leptospirosis is caused by the bacterium Leptospira, a helix-shaped bacterium that is dependent on high humidity for survival. It is mostly transmitted through the contact of humans with contaminated water and soil, which contains urine or tissues of an infected animal, ranging from mice to wild pigs to deer.

In Australia, the highest rate of incidence is in Queensland, particularly for people who are exposed to river, stream, canal, lake water and floodwaters contaminated with the urine and tissues of infected domestic and wild animals. The Leptospiral culture collection at the World Health Organization (WHO) Laboratory for Reference and Research on Leptospirosis in Brisbane is used in diagnostic pathology applications to identify bacteria and antibodies from patients and animals with Leptospirosis.

== Significance of collection ==
The Leptospiral culture collection consists of over 300 different types of Leptospira cultures and is one of only several collections of its kind in the world. The work of the laboratory supports the fight against the disease by providing analysis and diagnostic support to public and private pathology providers, both nationally and internationally.

The Leptospiral culture collection supports activities integral to the:

- Biosecurity Act 2015
- Environment Protection and Biodiversity Conservation Act 1999
- National Health Security Act 2007
- Public Health Act 2005
- Queensland Public Health Regulation 2018

In Queensland, the disease is most prevalent in farmers in humid climates where approximately 100 cases are reported each year. While most cases cause few to mild symptoms, in severe cases Leptospirosis causes jaundice and can lead to kidney failure and ultimately death. The work of the World Health Organization (WHO) Laboratory for Reference and Research on Leptospirosis in Brisbane is considered integral by the Queensland Government to the monitoring of the disease around the world, as well as further research into its pathogenesis in humans.
