= QE2 Hospital =

QE2 Hospital may refer to:

- New QEII Hospital, in Hertfordshire
- Queen Elizabeth II Health Sciences Centre, in Halifax, Nova Scotia
- Queen Elizabeth II Jubilee Hospital, in Brisbane, Australia
