= Murder of Syeid Alam =

2016 murder in Queensland, Australia

Syeid Alam was an Australian man who was killed and then beheaded in Rockhampton, Queensland on 5 April 2016.

On 13 February 2020, a jury at the Rockhampton Supreme Court found Mohammed Khan guilty of murder and was sentenced to life in jail.

However, on 6 November 2020, Khan's murder conviction was quashed by the Queensland Court of Appeal. The court ordered a verdict of acquittal be entered instead.

== Background ==
The headless body of 33-year-old Allenstown man Syeid Alam was found by a Queensland State Emergency Service volunteer in Sydney Gully near Macalister Street in the Rockhampton suburb of Park Avenue on 16 April 2016. His head was found nearby wrapped in jeans.

Eleven days prior to Alam's body being found, his wife reported him missing after becoming concerned when he failed to return from a fishing trip to the gully which flows into the nearby Fitzroy River, a short distance from the Fitzroy River Barrage. He had been last seen by his wife on 5 April 2016. Alam's black Toyota Camry, was found on a nearby street on 7 April 2016.

Following the discovery of Alam's decapitated body and a suspected murder weapon, the Queensland Police Service treated his death as suspicious and appealed to the public for information, particularly those who may have been in or around the riverbank in Park Avenue.

Police also dismissed suggestions by some of the local media that a crocodile had been involved in Alam's death.

Property identified as belonging to Alam was found downstream near a boat ramp off Reaney Street in Berserker on 19 April 2016.

Alam's funeral was held on 20 April 2016. At the time of his death, Alam was a father of two with his wife pregnant with his third child. The family had lived in Rockhampton for about four years after arriving in Australia from Burma.

On 4 May 2016, police established a crime scene at a Dean Street property in Berserker as they examined the property in connection with Alam's suspected murder, which included the use of dog squads.

== Suspect charged ==
In May 2016, Alam's friend, co-worker and former housemate 34-year-old Mohammed Khan was arrested and charged with murdering Alam and interfering with his corpse.

The 34-year-old Berserker man appeared in Rockhampton Magistrates Court on 17 May 2016 where he was remanded in custody.

Khan had been employed as a halal slaughterman at the Teys Australia meat processing facility in Lakes Creek where Alam also worked. Both men were part of Rockhampton's Rohingya community.

Police praised the Rohingya community for their assistance with communication with witnesses to overcome a language barrier during the investigation.

After Khan's arrest, the case slowly progressed through the courts and was mentioned in the Rockhampton Magistrates Court on 29 June 2016, 21 September 2016, 19 October 2016 and 8 December 2016.

In March 2017, Khan applied for bail in the Brisbane Supreme Court and issued an affidavit advising that he intended to plead not guilty, denying that he was responsible for Alam's death and claiming he had been shocked and saddened when he learnt of Alam's death. Khan was denied bail in the Brisbane Supreme Court on 24 April 2017.

The case was held up in 2018 when a scheduled two-day committal hearing had to be rescheduled when it was discovered two witnesses for the prosecution had moved overseas.

The committal hearing finally went ahead on 14 December 2018 where police alleged that between 7pm and 8pm on 5 April 2016, Khan slit Alam's throat before chopping his head off with a tomahawk.

After entering not guilty pleas to one count of murder and one count of improper handling of a head body, Khan was ordered to stand trial.

The trial was expected to commence in late 2019 but Khan's defence solicitor successfully requested during a mention in the Supreme Court on 2 September 2019 to have the trial postponed until January 2020 due to the expected absence of the defence barrister.

== Trial ==
A trial commenced in the Rockhampton Supreme Court commenced on 28 January 2020.

However, the case was adjourned on 30 January 2020 due to the unavailability of a Rohingya interpreter.

The trial re-commenced in the Rockhampton Supreme Court on 3 February 2020.

In their opening statements, the crown prosecutor told the court that the catalyst for Alam's murder had begun several months beforehand when Khan learnt Alam's brother had been having an affair with his wife, and possessed an explicit image of Khan's wife taken from a Skype call, while Khan's defence counsel claimed there was a lack of scientific evidence linking Khan to the crime, and there was evidence the friendship between Alam and Khan had endured despite Khan knowing about his wife's affair with Alam's brother.

During the trial, the court heard testimony from Alam's widow, Alam's brother, a Queensland Police forensic scientist and a forensic pathologist from the John Tonge Centre.

After six days of evidence was heard, the jury retired on 11 February 2020 to deliberate.

On 13 February 2020, the jury returned its verdict, finding Mohammed Khan guilty of murdering Syeid Alam.

Justice Graeme Crow then sentenced Khan to life imprisonment.

In sentencing, Crow described how Khan had been offered a new chance of life in Australia and was working and contributing to the Rockhampton community until he murdered his friend. Crow added that the beheading of any human was "truly horrendous" and that he had caused issues for Alam's wife, both psychologically and with the conditions surrounding her visa as she now no longer had someone to provide for her family.

Through his interpreter, Khan replied that the court had betrayed him because he was a foreigner and said that he believed there was insufficient evidence to prove he was guilty.

== Acquittal ==
Khan was acquitted of his murder conviction by the Queensland Court of Appeal on 6 November 2020. The court ordered a verdict of acquittal be entered in place of the original conviction.

Khan's defense barrister had argued that the jury had been misdirected and that CCTV footage had not been enough to establish culpability.
