= William N. Robertson =

Scottish-Australian surgeon and academic

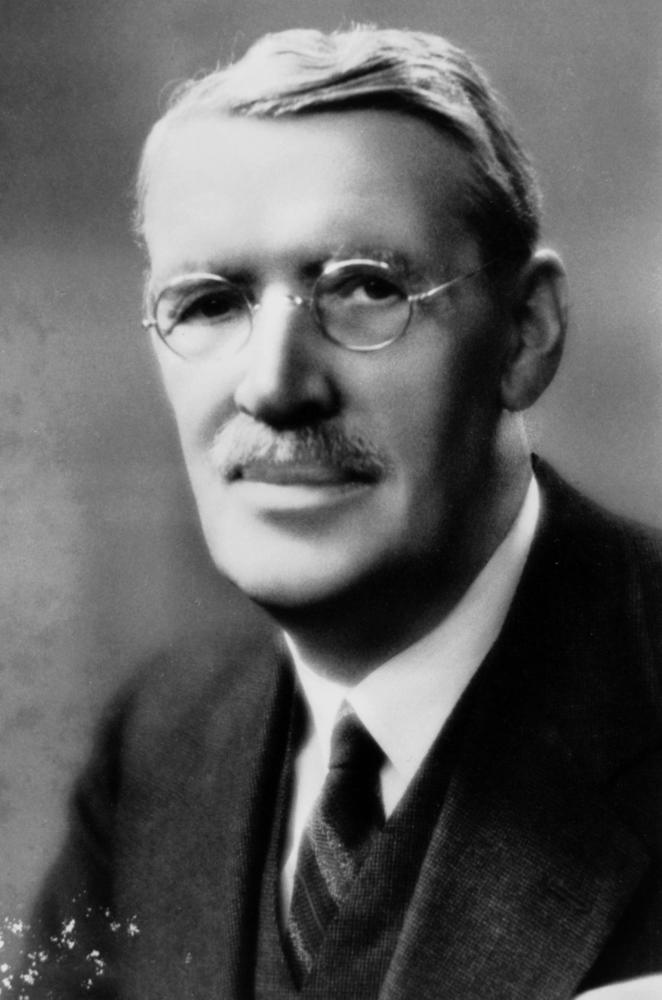
William Nathaniel Robertson, 1866–1938

William N. Robertson (1866–1938) C.B.E., CMG was a Scottish-Australian surgeon who served as Vice Chancellor of the University of Queensland in Brisbane, Queensland, Australia. The suburb of Robertson in Brisbane is named after him.

== Early life ==
William Nathaniel Robertson was born in Edinburgh, Scotland in 1866, the son of Rev. Peter Robertson and his wife. His parents left him in the care of his grandparents in Scotland where he attended Royal High School in Edinburgh and enrolled in the University of Edinburgh in 1888, taking his Bachelor of Medicine and Master of Surgery degrees in 1892. He worked in hospitals in Scotland and London. His family emigrated to Australia in 1873 to improve Mrs Robertson's health and moved to Dalby and later Ipswich, Queensland where his father was a Presbyterian minister. After completing his medical studies Robertson joined his family in Australia in 1893 and he opened a general medical practice in Ipswich. He later served as an ear, nose and throat specialist in Brisbane, and was an honorary surgeon with the Royal Brisbane Hospital and Mater Misericordiae Hospital. He founded the ear, nose and throat department at the Mater Hospital, serving there from 1913-1926.

== Support for education ==
Robertson supported the establishment of a medical school and university in Queensland and was elected a member of the University of Queensland Senate in its second term. He was appointed Vice-Chancellor of the University of Queensland, serving from 1926 to 1938. He was an advocate for education supporting Presbyterian schools and more affordable higher education. He was honoured with a Commander of the Order of St Michael and St George in 1931 for his university and public services. He was on the founding committee which established the Royal Australasian College of Surgeons.

== War service work ==
After being rejected for active service, he served as a Major in the Australian Army Medical Corps during World War I in home service, and was a member of the Repatriation Board, Medical War Committee and Wounded Sailors and Soldiers’ Fund. He served on the medical faculty of the University. He was honoured with a Commander of the British Empire for his war time services in 1922.

== Personal life ==
Robertson married Clara Pollard in 1899. They lived in Craigston in Wickham Terrace (now heritage-listed) where a number of other medical specialists maintained their residences and private rooms. They had four children. Robertson died at Craigston after a short illness on 12 June 1938 aged 52 years. His funeral was held at St Andrews Presbyterian Church in Creek Street after which he was cremated at Mount Thompson Crematorium.

== Awards and memberships ==
Robertson received numerous awards and held leading roles in many organisations, including:

- President of the British Medical Association, Queensland (four times)
- Vice-President of the British Medical Association
- Doctor of Laws of University of Edinburgh, honoris causa, 1938
- Trustee, National Art Gallery
- Member, Royal Geographical Society
- Member, Rotary Club
- Member, Crippled Children's Association
- Chairman, AMP Society, Queensland
- Chairman, Johnsonian Club
- Commander of the British Empire (CBE), 1922
- Commander of the Order of St Michael and St George (CMG), 1931

== Legacy ==
Since 1940, an annual prize has been given in his name to a medical student of the University of Queensland. Following a bequest of his daughter Clara Joan Roe in 1984, an annual scholarship is presented in his name to assist with medical research. The suburb of Robertson in Brisbane was named in his honour.
