= Coopers Plains, Queensland =

Coopers Plains
- Suburb
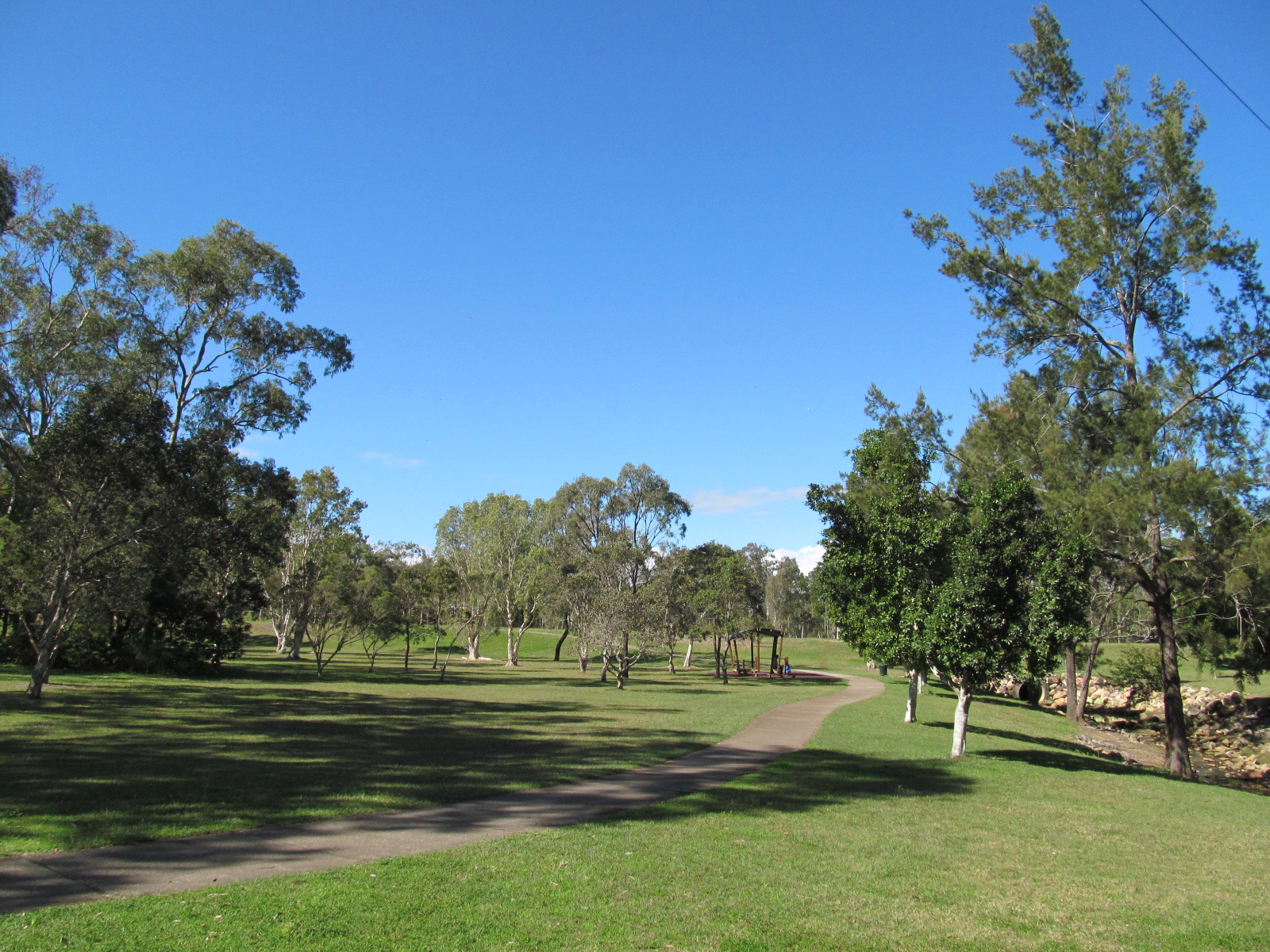
- Beryl Roberts park

- Interactive map of Coopers Plains
- Coordinates: 27.5680°S 153.035°E
- Country: Australia
- State: Queensland
- City: Brisbane
- LGA: City of Brisbane (Moorooka Ward)
- Location: 14.0 km (8.7 mi) S of Brisbane CBD

Government
  - State electorates: Toohey; Stretton
  - Federal division: Moreton

Area
  - Total: 4.2 km^{2} (1.6 sq mi)

Population
  - Total: 5,675 (2021 census)
  - Density: 1,351/km^{2} (3,500/sq mi)
- Time zone: UTC+10:00 (AEST)
- Postcode: 4108
Suburbs around Coopers Plains
Rocklea	Salisbury	Nathan
Archerfield	Coopers Plains	Robertson
Acacia Ridge	Sunnybank	Sunnybank

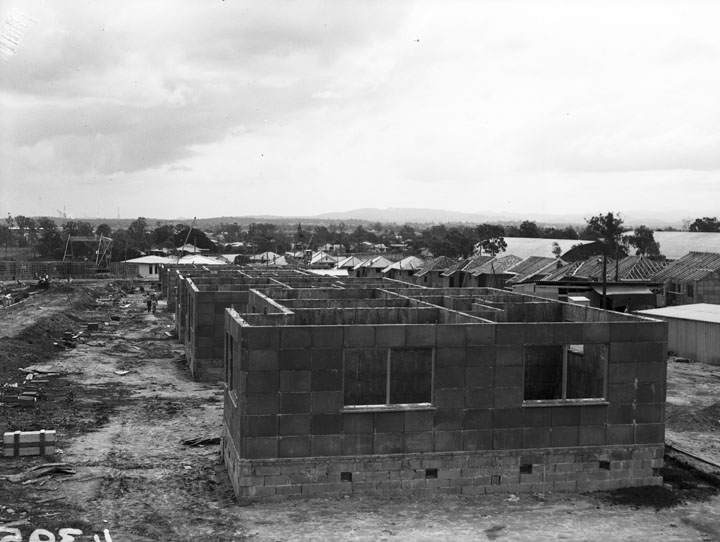
Houses being built at Coopers Plains, 1952

Coopers Plains is a southern suburb in the City of Brisbane, Queensland, Australia. In the 2021 census, Coopers Plains had a population of 5,675.

== Geography ==
Coopers Plains is 11 kilometres (7 mi) south-west of the Brisbane CBD. The suburb is home to the Queen Elizabeth II Jubilee Hospital.

== History ==
The locality was originally called Cowper's Plains. It was probably named by Patrick Logan after Dr Henry Cowper, Assistant Surgeon-in-Charge at the Moreton Bay Penal Settlement from 1823 to 1832. A convict settlement was established at Cowper's Plains in 1828. The name was corrupted and by 1860 the area was known as Cooper's Plains. By 1877 it was known as Coopers Plains.

The first post office opened in 1876.

In October 1884, 275 allotments of "Flemington Estate" were advertised for sale by T. Howling& Co. A map advertising the sale states that the estate was close to the Coopers Plains Railway Station and that coaches passed the estate every day.

Coopers Plains railway station on the South Coast railway line (now the Beenleigh line) opened in 1885.

In August 1885, 160 subdivided allotments of "The Orange Grove Estate" were advertised to be auctioned by G. T. Bell in conjunction with A. Lucas & Co. A map advertising the auction shows the proximity of the estate to Coopers Plains Railway Station and Salisbury Railway Station. The allotments were advertised as high and dry and free from gullies with permanent spring water, convenient to rail and road and close to proximity to schools and the post office.

In April 1886, 119 allotments of "The Homebush Estate" were advertised to be auctioned by G. T. Bell. A map advertising the auction states that the estate was adjoining the Coopers Plains railway station and illustrates the location of lagoons and permanent water sources within the estate.

In December 1922, 6 blocks of land of "Market Garden Estate" were advertised for private sale by Isles, Love & Co. Ltd. A map advertising the sale describes each block as 4 to 5 acres in size with splendid brown and black alluvial loam and abundantly watered by a permanent creek.

Orange Grove State School opened on 27 June 1931. In 1965 it was renamed Coopers Plains State School.

Coopers Plains remained rural until the 1940s. The United States Army built a barracks adjacent to the railway station 1942, which after the war became the Australian Army's Damour Barracks.

In 1928, a United Protestant Church Hall was built at 30 Beaton Street (27.5683°S 153.0366°E) being available for all Protestant services. Being close to the Coopers Plains railway station, it was known as Station United Protestant Church. By 1945 the building had deteriorated to the point of being condemned. On 11 April 1950, the Anglican Church bought the building for £25 and it opened as an Anglican church on 25 June 1950. It was known as St Luke's by June 1954. A new Anglican church (St Barnabas') was opened in Sunnybank in 1986 and St Luke's was sold to the Egyptian Coptic Church on 19 March 1986 and it was renamed St Mary & St Joseph's Coptic Orthodox Church.

On 22 March 1975, St Davids Coopers Plains Uniting Church was formed by the amalgamation of the Moorooka, Salisbury and Coopers Plains Congregational Church, the Coopers Plains Methodist Church, and the Salisbury Presbyterian Church.

The Coopers Plains Library opened in 1979 with a major refurbishment in 2014.

== Demographics ==
In the 2021 census, Coopers Plains had a population of 5,675, 49% female and 51% male. The median age of the Coopers Plains population was 33, five years below the Australian median. 48% of people living in Coopers Plains were born in Australia, compared to the national average of 66.9%. The other top responses for country of birth were India 10%, China 6.6%, Philippines 3.5%, Taiwan 2.7% and Vietnam 2.3%. 47.1% of people spoke only English at home; the next most popular languages were 10.8% Mandarin, 4.9% Gujarati, 3.7% Cantonese, 2.8% Vietnamese and 1.8% Hindi. The most popular religious affiliation was "No Religion" (35.2%), followed by Catholic (15.2%) and Hinduism (10%).

In the 2016 census, Coopers Plains had a population of 5,483, 49.7% female and 50.3% male. The median age of the Coopers Plains population was 32, 6 years below the Australian median. 47% of people living in Coopers Plains were born in Australia, compared to the national average of 66.7%. The other top responses for country of birth were China 7.7%, India 7.6%, Philippines 3.1%, New Zealand 2.8% and Taiwan 2.3%. 50.1% of people spoke only English at home; the next most popular languages were 10.3% Mandarin, 3.7% Cantonese, 2.9% Gujarati, 2.3% Vietnamese and 2% Tagalog. The most popular religious affiliation was "No Religion" (29.2%), followed by Catholic (16.4%) and Anglican (7%).

In the 2011 census, the population of Coopers Plains was 4,208, 49% female and 51% male. The median age of the Coopers Plains population was 34, three years below the Australian median. 57% of people living in Coopers Plains were born in Australia, compared to the national average of 69.8%. The other top responses for country of birth were India 6.2%, China 5.3%, New Zealand 2.9%, Philippines 2.2% and England 2.1%. 61.9% of people spoke only English at home; the next most popular languages were 6% Mandarin, 3.2% Cantonese, 2% Vietnamese, 1.6% Hindi and 1.3% Punjabi. The most popular religious affiliation was "No Religion" (22%), followed by Catholic (21%) and Anglican (12%).

== Education ==
Coopers Plains State School is a government primary (Prep–6) school for boys and girls at 61 Orange Grove Road (27.5675°S 153.0388°E). In 2017, the school had an enrolment of 184 students with 18 teachers (13 full-time equivalent) and 13 non-teaching staff (8 full-time equivalent).

There are no secondary schools in Coopers Plains. The nearest government secondary school is Sunnybank State High School in neighbouring Sunnybank to the south-east.

== Facilities ==
The Health and Food Sciences Precinct (HFSP), at the Queensland Health Forensic and Scientific Services (QHFSS) campus, was opened in 2010, and would include the Queensland Centre for Emerging Infectious Diseases (QCEID). The precinct is a research facility for the Queensland Department of Agriculture, Fisheries and Forestry, CSIRO, and Queensland University through the Queensland Alliance for Agriculture and Food Innovation (QAAFI).

== Amenities ==
The Brisbane City Council operate a public library at 107 Orange Grove Road.

St Davids Coopers Plains Uniting Church is at 68 Orange Grove Road (north-west corner with Rookwood Avenue, 27.5666°S 153.0386°E), the site of the former St David's Coopers Plains Presbyterian Church.

== Transport ==
There are several bus routes running through Coopers Plains – 120 (City – Garden City), 135 (City – Parkinson), 123 (Sunnybank), 598 and 599 (Great Circle Line), 124 and 125. Coopers Plains is also in very close proximity to the Griffith University Nathan Campus.
