= MacGregor, Queensland =

MacGregor
- Suburb
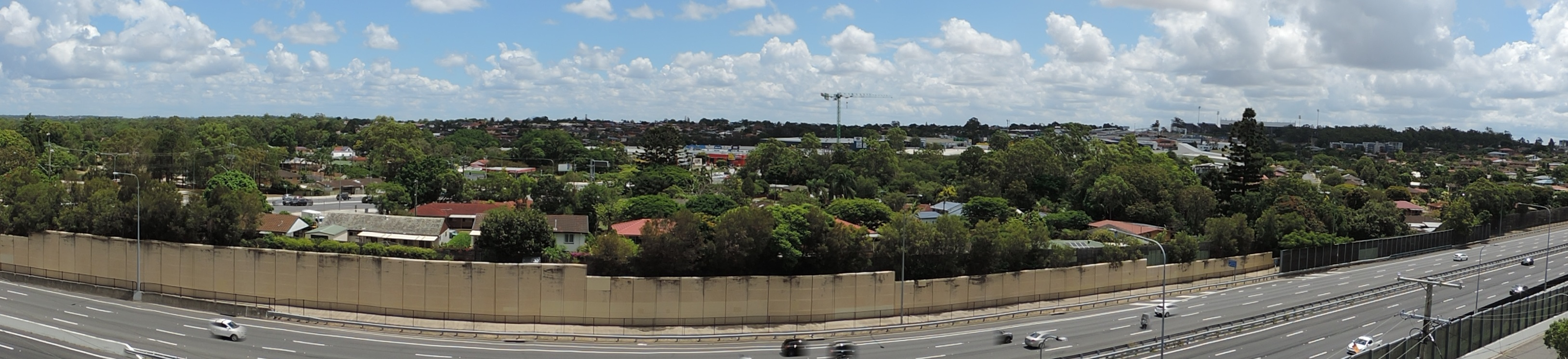
- Looking west towards MacGregor suburb, from Upper Mount Gravatt

- Interactive map of MacGregor
- Coordinates: 27.565°S 153.0758°E
- Country: Australia
- State: Queensland
- City: Brisbane
- LGA: City of Brisbane (MacGregor Ward)
- Location: 13.0 km (8.1 mi) S of Brisbane CBD
- Established: 1967

Government
  - State electorate: Toohey
  - Federal division: Moreton

Area
  - Total: 2.7 km^{2} (1.0 sq mi)

Population
  - Total: 5,980 (2021 census)
  - Density: 2,210/km^{2} (5,740/sq mi)
- Time zone: UTC+10:00 (AEST)
- Postcode: 4109
Suburbs around MacGregor
Nathan	Upper Mount Gravatt	Upper Mount Gravatt
Robertson	MacGregor	Upper Mount Gravatt
Sunnybank	Eight Mile Plains	Eight Mile Plains

MacGregor is a southern suburb in the City of Brisbane, Queensland, Australia. In the 2021 census, MacGregor had a population of 5,980 people.

== History ==
Previously part of Sunnybank, the suburb was named by the Queensland Place Names Board on 1 August 1967. The suburb of MacGregor was named after Scottish-born Sir William MacGregor who was the Governor of Queensland from 1909 until 1914. It is spelt MacGregor, but Macgregor is often seen.

MacGregor State High School opened on 28 January 1969 with nine teachers and 203 students. On 4 November 1973, a tornado struck the school, causing hundred of thousands of dollars' worth of damage and requiring the rebuilding of much of the school.

MacGregor State School opened on 24 January 1972. Students wears the red MacGregor tartan as part of their school uniform.

== Demographics ==
In the 2011 census, the population of MacGregor was 5,576, 51.6% female and 48.4% male. The median age of the MacGregor population was 32 years of age, 5 years below the Australian median. Of all people living in MacGregor, 41.9% were born in Australia, compared to the national average of 69.8%; the next most common countries of birth were China 15%, Taiwan 6.3%, India 4.6%, New Zealand 3.3% and Vietnam at 2.3%. 44.4% of people spoke only English at home; the next most popular languages were 20.2% Mandarin, 7.2% Cantonese, 2.7% Vietnamese, 2.3% Korean and 2.2% Greek. The most common religious affiliation was 'No religion' (25.7%); the next most common responses were Catholic 16.2%, Buddhism 10.0%, Anglican 8.4% and Uniting Church 5.7%.

In the 2016 census, MacGregor had a population of 5,844 people.

In the 2021 census, MacGregor had a population of 5,980 people.

== Education ==
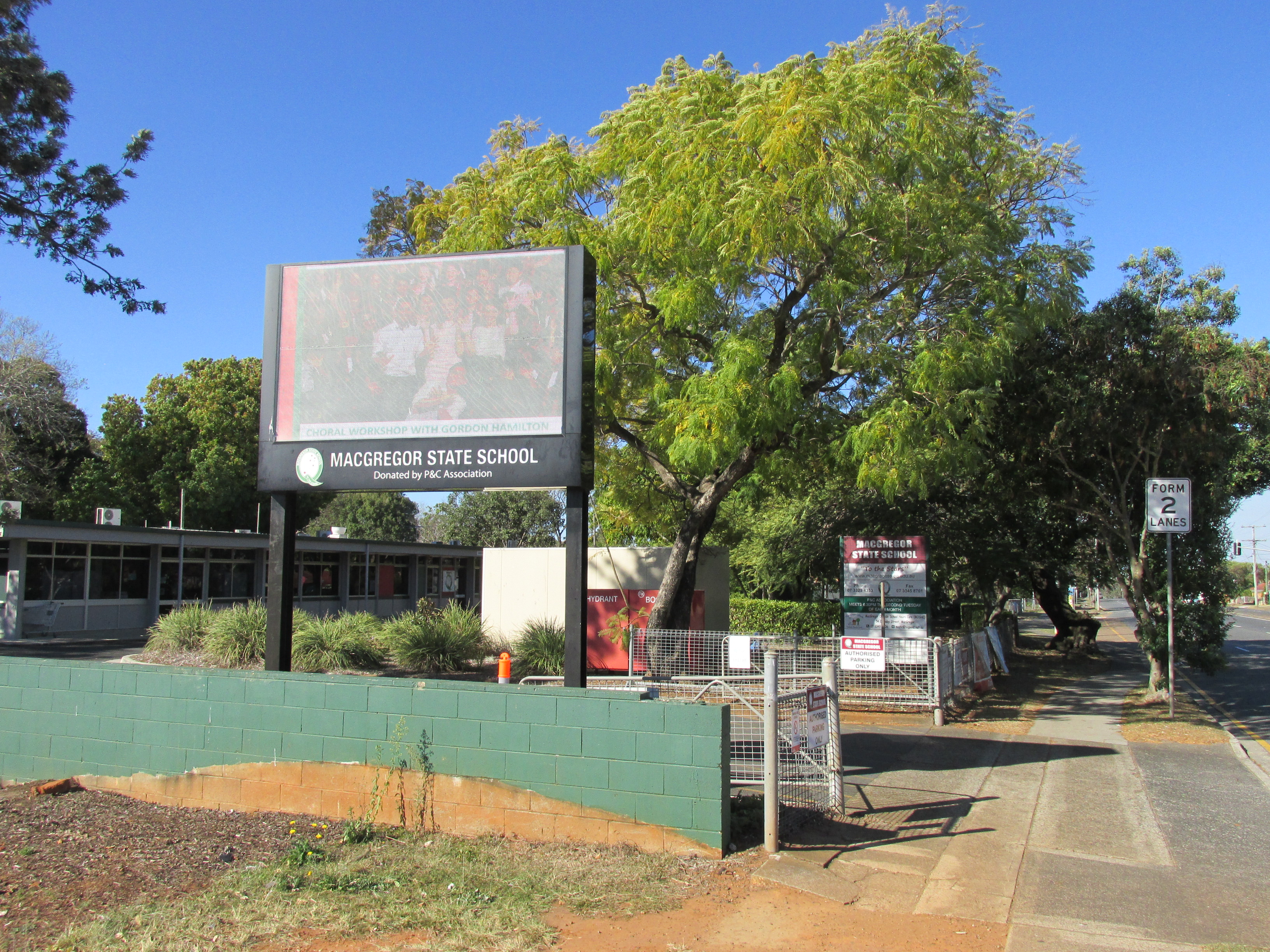
MacGregor State School, 2018

MacGregor State School is a government primary (Prep–6) school for boys and girls at McCullough Street (27.5722°S 153.0672°E). In 2018, the school had an enrolment of 1,347 students with 94 teachers (83 full-time equivalent) and 59 non-teaching staff (37 full-time equivalent).

MacGregor State High School is a government secondary (7–12) school for boys and girls at Blackwattle Street (27.5660°S 153.0766°E). In 2018, the school had an enrolment of 1,221 students with 115 teachers (107 full-time equivalent) and 55 non-teaching staff (37 full-time equivalent).

Griffith University and the Queensland Sport and Athletics Centre are in the adjoining suburb of Nathan.

== Facilities ==
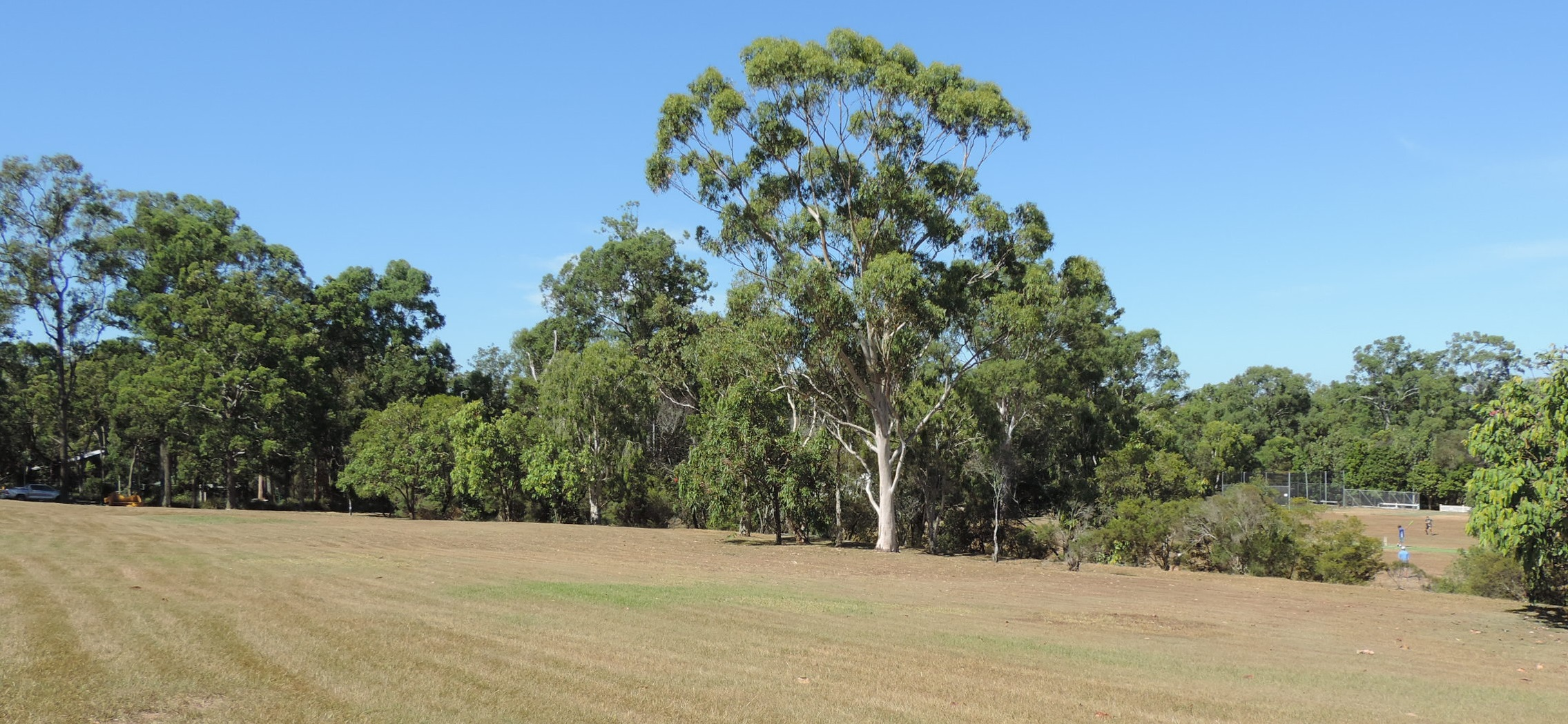
D. M. Henderson Park

Additional to the schools, there is a Robertson Scout Group, a large recreational area of the D. M. Henderson Park, and the MacGregor Netball Association playing fields. The park was named after local resident Daniel Murray Henderson (c. 1871 – 3 July 1954), who was a strawberry and small crops farmer.

== Gallery ==
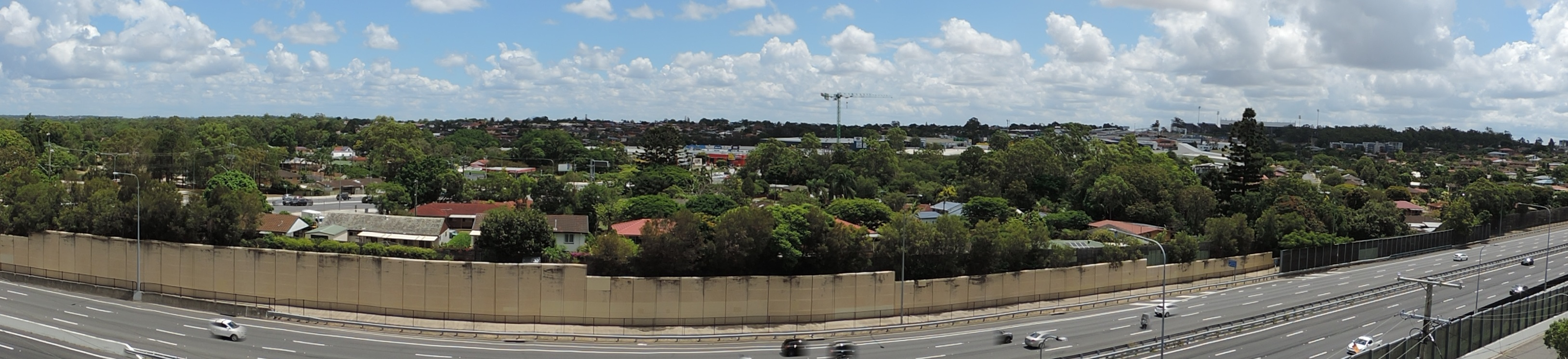
MacGregor suburb panorama, looking from the east.

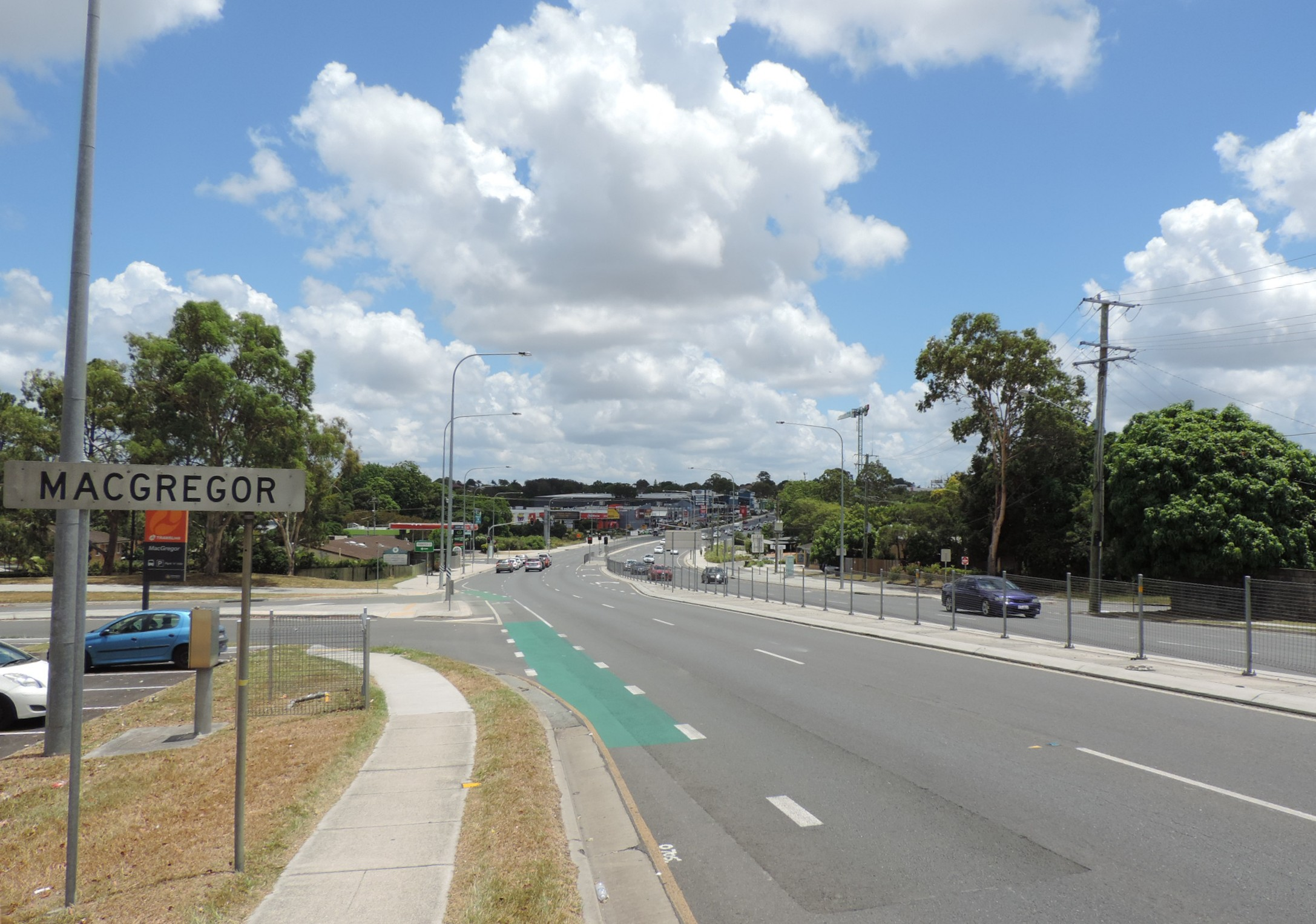
Kessels Road, looking west.

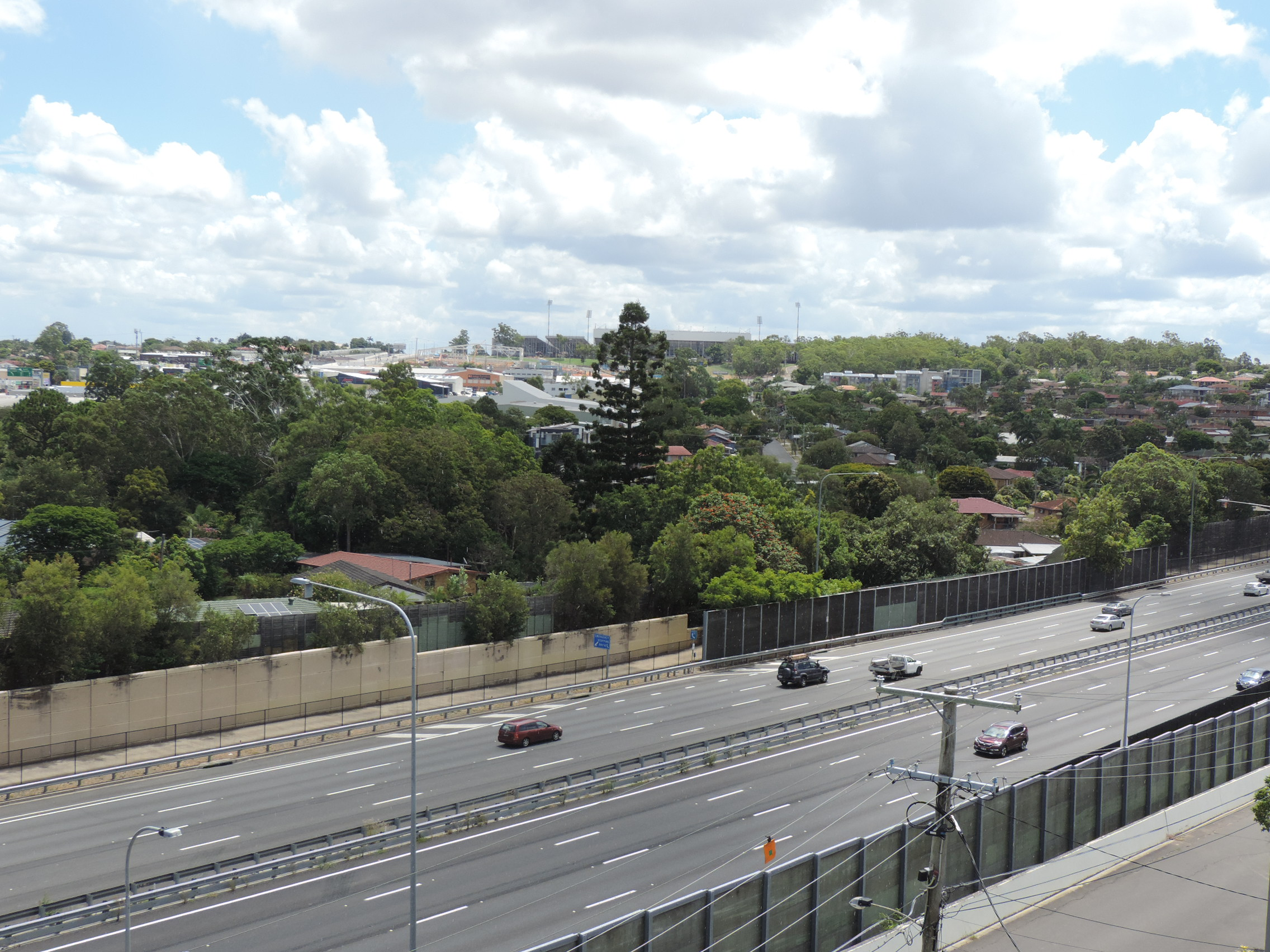
Looking over the suburb towards the sports stadium.

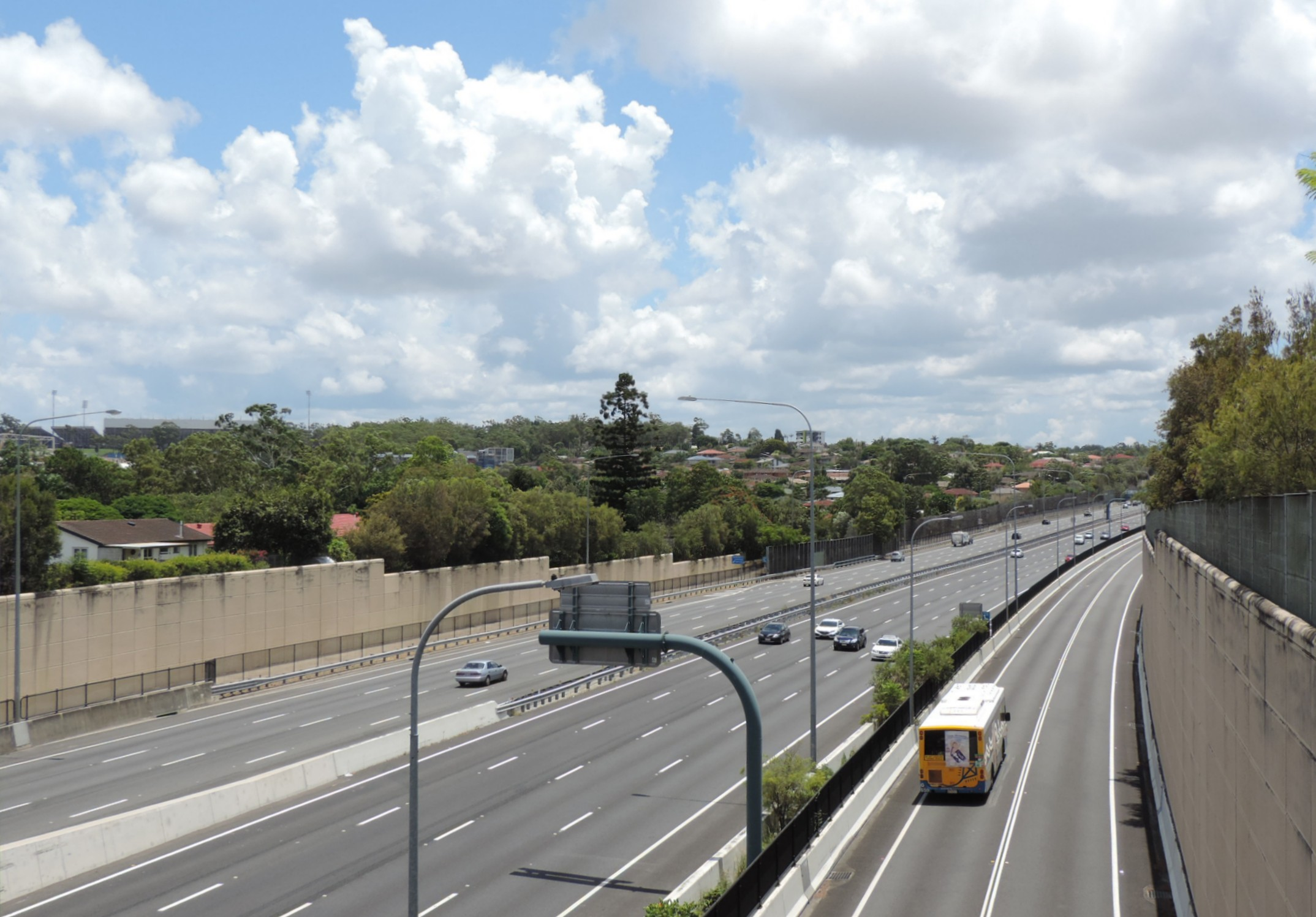
MacGregor suburb on left of Pacific Motorway.

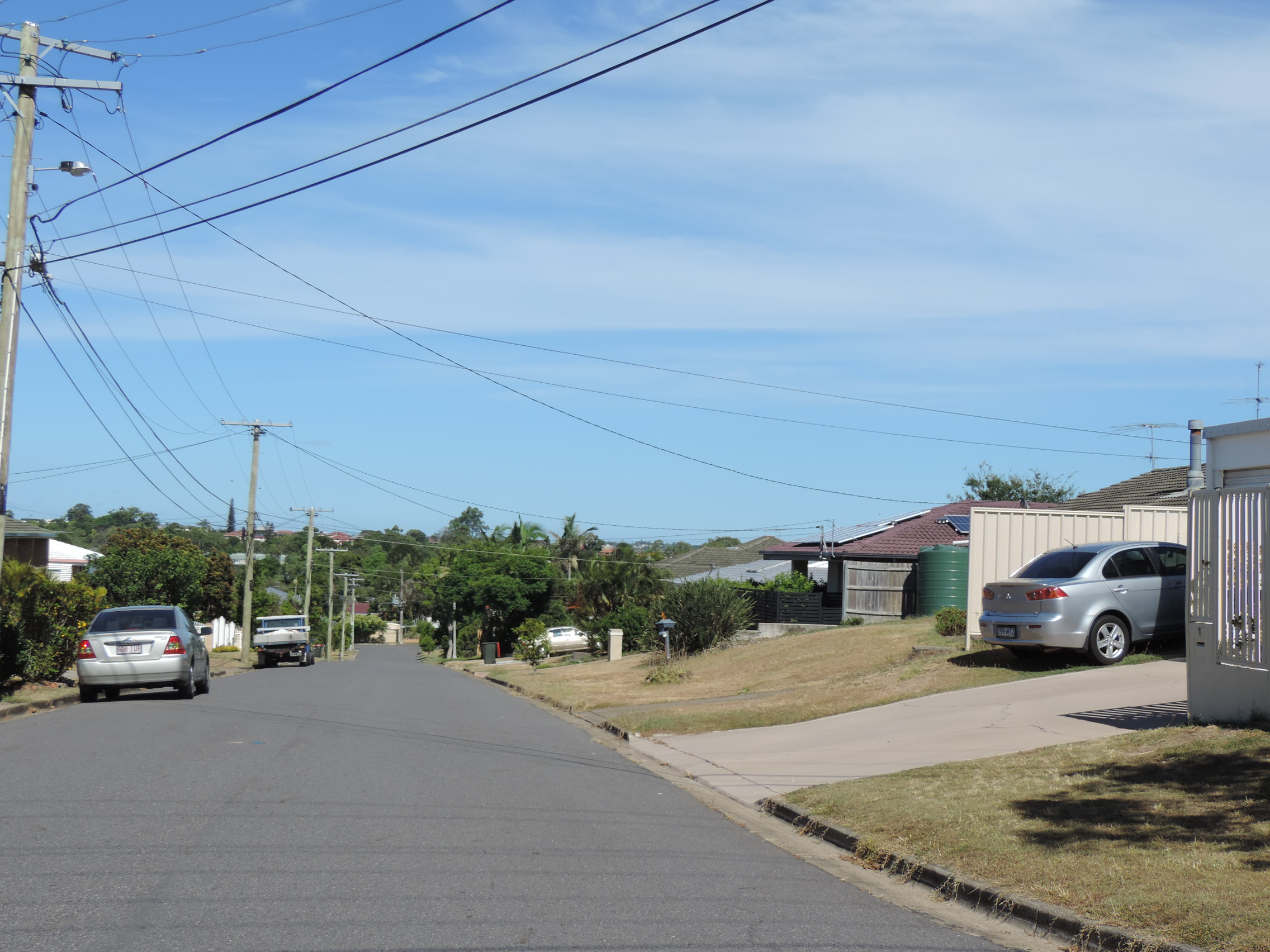
A western-side suburban street.

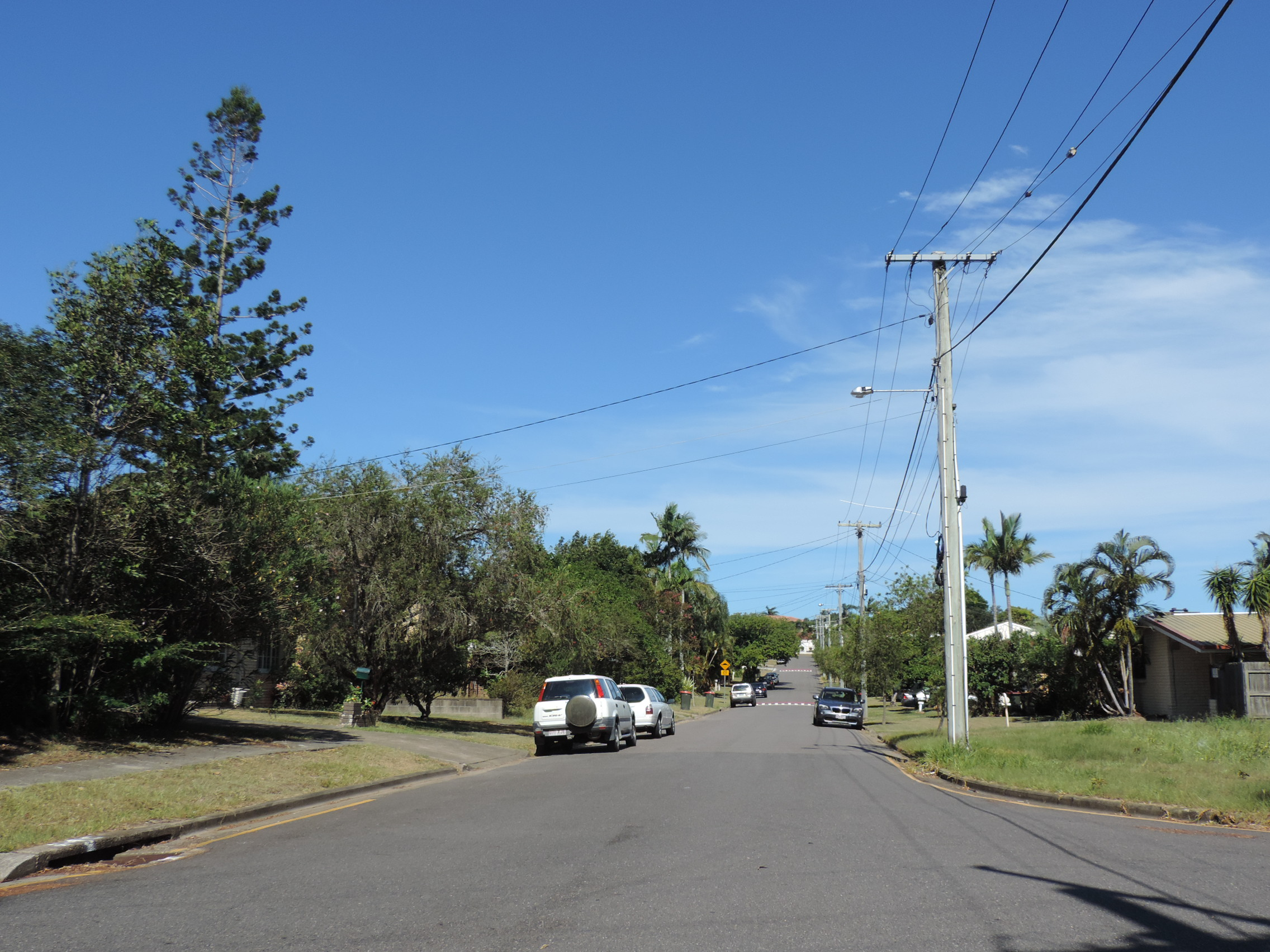
An eastern-side suburban street.

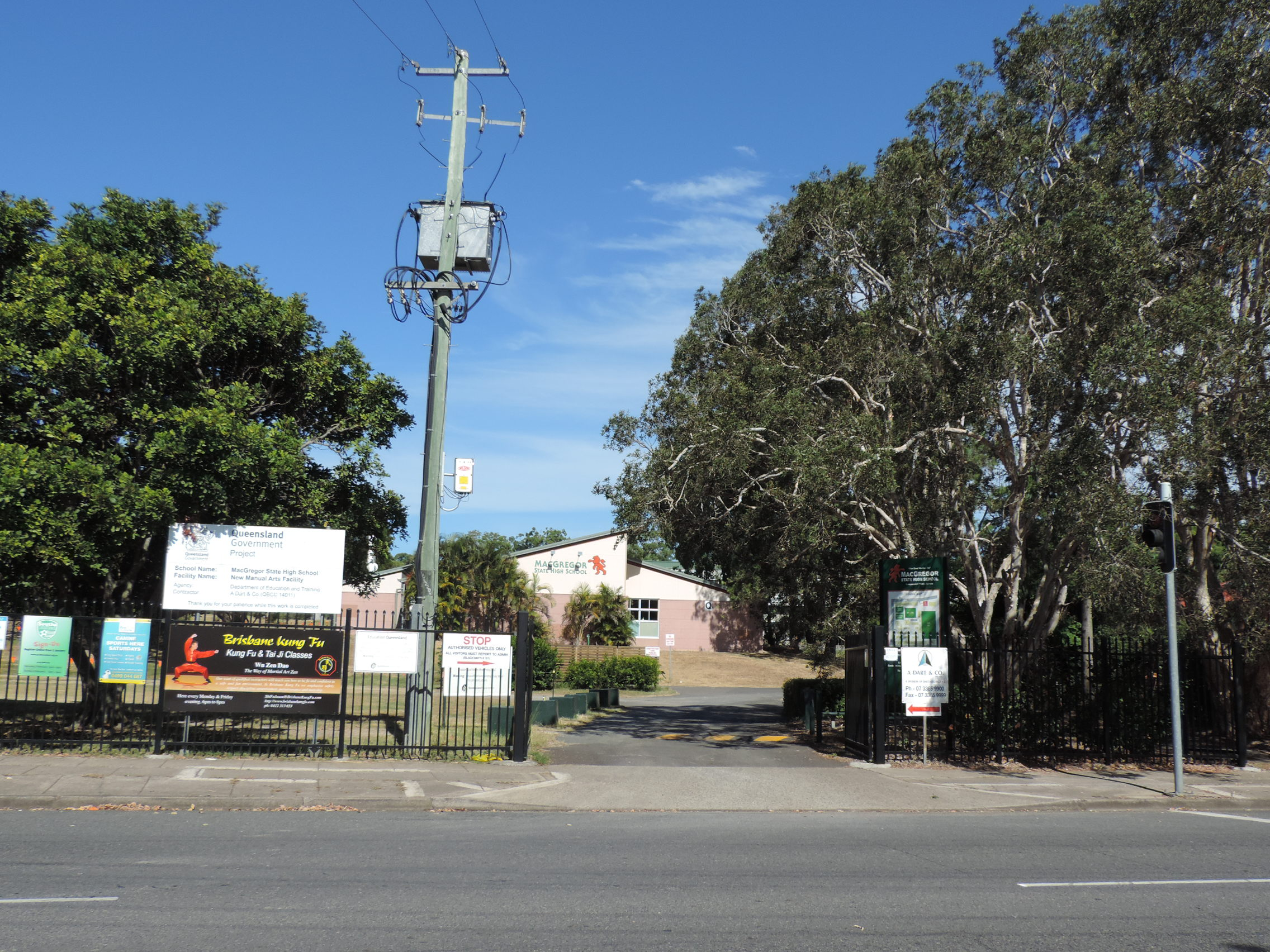
MacGregor State High School side entrance.

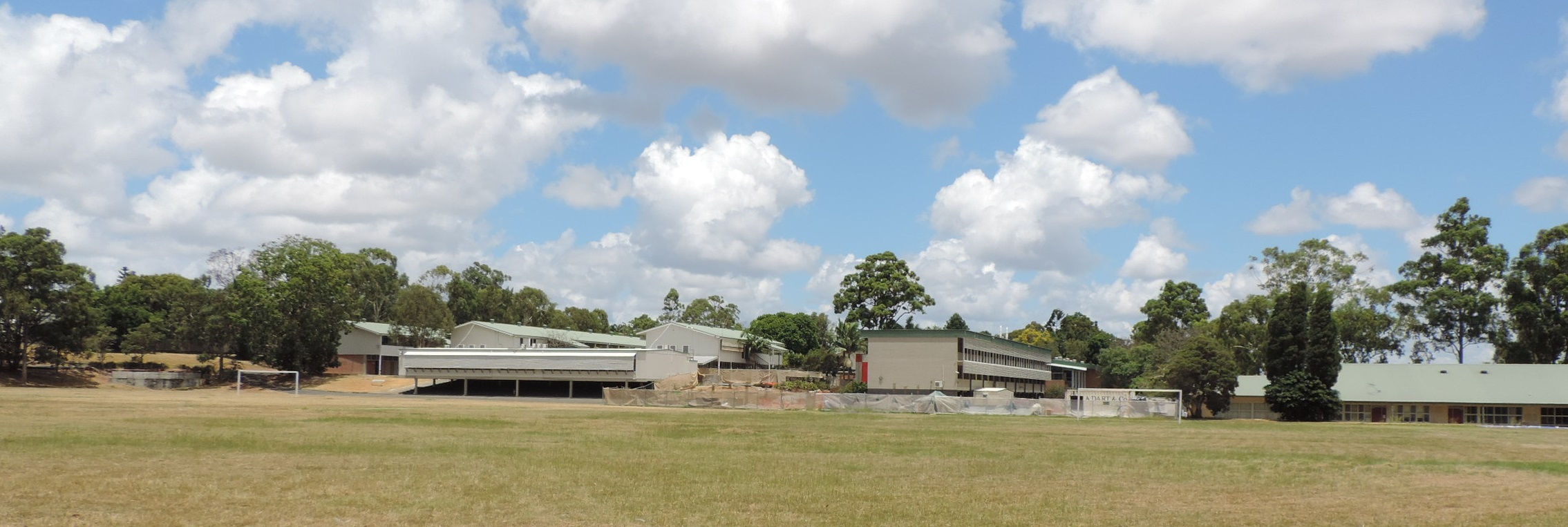
MacGregor State High School oval.
