= Forensic and Scientific Services =

Coronial and Public Health Sciences, Pathology Queensland. (Formerly Forensic and Scientific Services)
- Established: 1989
- Location: 39 Kessels Road, Coopers Plains, Queensland, 4108, Australia
- Operating agency: Queensland Health
- Website: Coronial and Public Health Sciences

Coronial and Public Health Sciences (CPHS) is part of Queensland Health and provides specialist scientific and medical analysis and independent expert advice in the state of Queensland, Australia. It is sometimes referred to as the John Tonge Centre.

== Services ==
Coronial and Public Health Sciences are part of the government response to threats to public health, threats to the environment, epidemics, civil emergencies, criminal investigations and coroners' inquiries into reportable deaths. Additionally they provide services to private and public sector clients in forensics, public health and environmental science.

- Forensic Pathology and Coronial services
  - Autopsy to determine cause and circumstances of death,
  - Mortuary, counselling services to bereaved families, coronial pathology and toxicology services and investigation of sudden or suspicious death. These services are located in the John Tonge Centre.
  - forensic testing for alcohol and drugs
  - advice on human ethics and tissue donation.
- Public and Environmental Health
  - Inorganic Chemistry analyse metals and elements in environmental samples such as water, soil, sediment, food, blood, urine and other biological tissues.
  - Organic Chemistry provide testing, analysis and advice on a range of issues including: residues and contaminants, algal identification, food testing, molecular and chemical testing, air monitoring.
  - Microbiology provide investigations, analysis, molecular epidemiology, diagnostic services and advice on bacterial outbreaks in food and water. The Public Health Microbiology laboratories also house the Leptospirosis and bacterial pathogens reference libraries.
  - Virology provide diagnostic and references services for viral and rickettsial diseases such as Coronavirus, Zika virus, Measles, Dengue fever, Norovirus and Influenza.

== Research and development ==
The research and development undertaken at CPHS is focused into two areas: Public and Environmental Health and Forensic Sciences.

Forensic and Scientific Services have an extensive collection of reference and clinical samples. External researchers can apply to access coronial and non-coronial biological data

== References in the media ==
Forensic and Scientific Services is often, and incorrectly, referred to by news media as the John Tonge Centre. The John Tonge Centre refers specifically to the mortuary.

== See also ==
- Health and Food Sciences Precinct, Coopers Plains
