= MacGregor State High School =

School in Brisbane, Australia

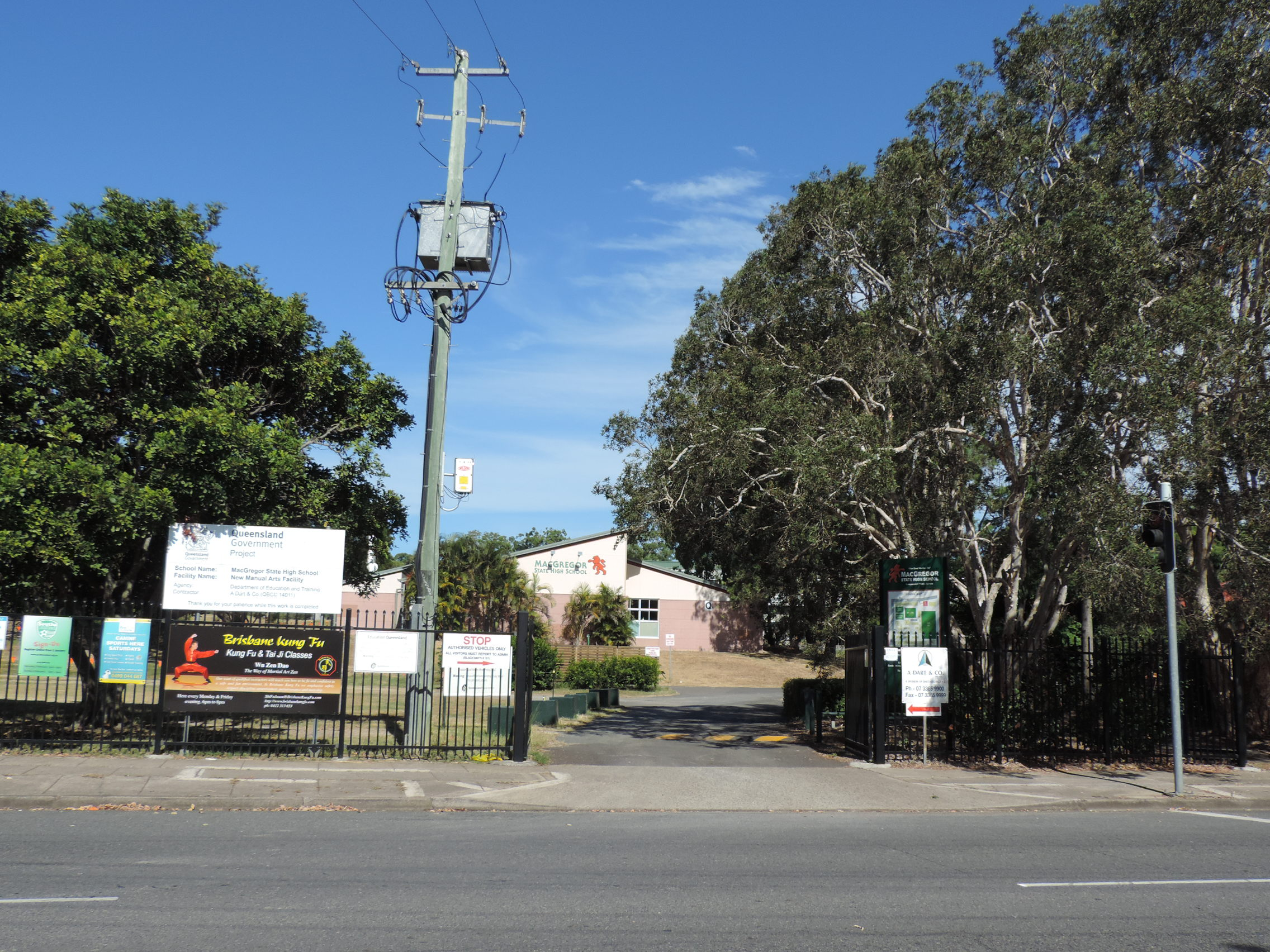
- Springfield Street side entrance, 2018

Location
- MacGregor, Brisbane, Queensland; Australia; 27.5655°S 153.0766°E

Information
- Type: Independent public, co-educational, secondary, day school
- Motto: The Best We Can Be
- Established: 1969; 57 years ago
- Principal: Bindi Lodge
- Staff: c. 158
- Years offered: Year 7 – Year 12
- Enrolment: 1,207 (2024)
- Campus: Suburban
- Colours: Red, white and green
- Website: https://macgregorshs.eq.edu.au/

MacGregor State High School (MSHS) is an independent public, (Note: One of 250 independent public schools in Queensland; It was one out of 54 public schools to be selected to become an independent public school in 2014.) co-educational secondary school located in the Brisbane suburb of MacGregor, Queensland Australia. It is administered by the Queensland Department of Education and, as of 2024, has an enrolment of 1,207 students, with 107 teaching staff and 51 non-teaching staff. The school caters to students from Year 7 to Year 12 and was established in 1969.

== History ==
MacGregor State High School opened on 28 January 1969, two years after the suburb of MacGregor was named, with nine teachers and 203 students. It was named after William MacGregor, a former Governor of Queensland.

In November 2006, a video of a brawl between two MacGregor students was uploaded to YouTube, gaining over 1000 views before being taken down in March 2007.

== Awards ==
The school has won awards in a variety of fields. There were the Education Minister's Awards for Excellence in Art (2004, 2006), the BHP Billiton Science Award (Physics, Engineering and Technology) (2001) and the Queensland Youth Music Awards (2006).

== Notable people ==
=== Staff ===
- Kirby Short, school deputy principal and former professional cricketer.

=== Alumni ===
- Daniel Amalm, guitarist and actor.
- Greg Creed, American businessman.
- Sophie Monk, singer, actress, and model.

== See also ==
- Education in Queensland
- List of schools in Queensland
