= Sunnybank State High School =

Location
- Boorman Street; Sunnybank, Queensland, 4109; Australia; 27°34′32.76″S 153°03′32.95″E

Information
- Type: State-run high school
- Motto: Many Ways to Excellence
- Opened: 1963
- Principal: Carmen Anderson
- Campus type: Suburban
- Colours: Green & gold
- Website: sunnybankshs.eq.edu.au
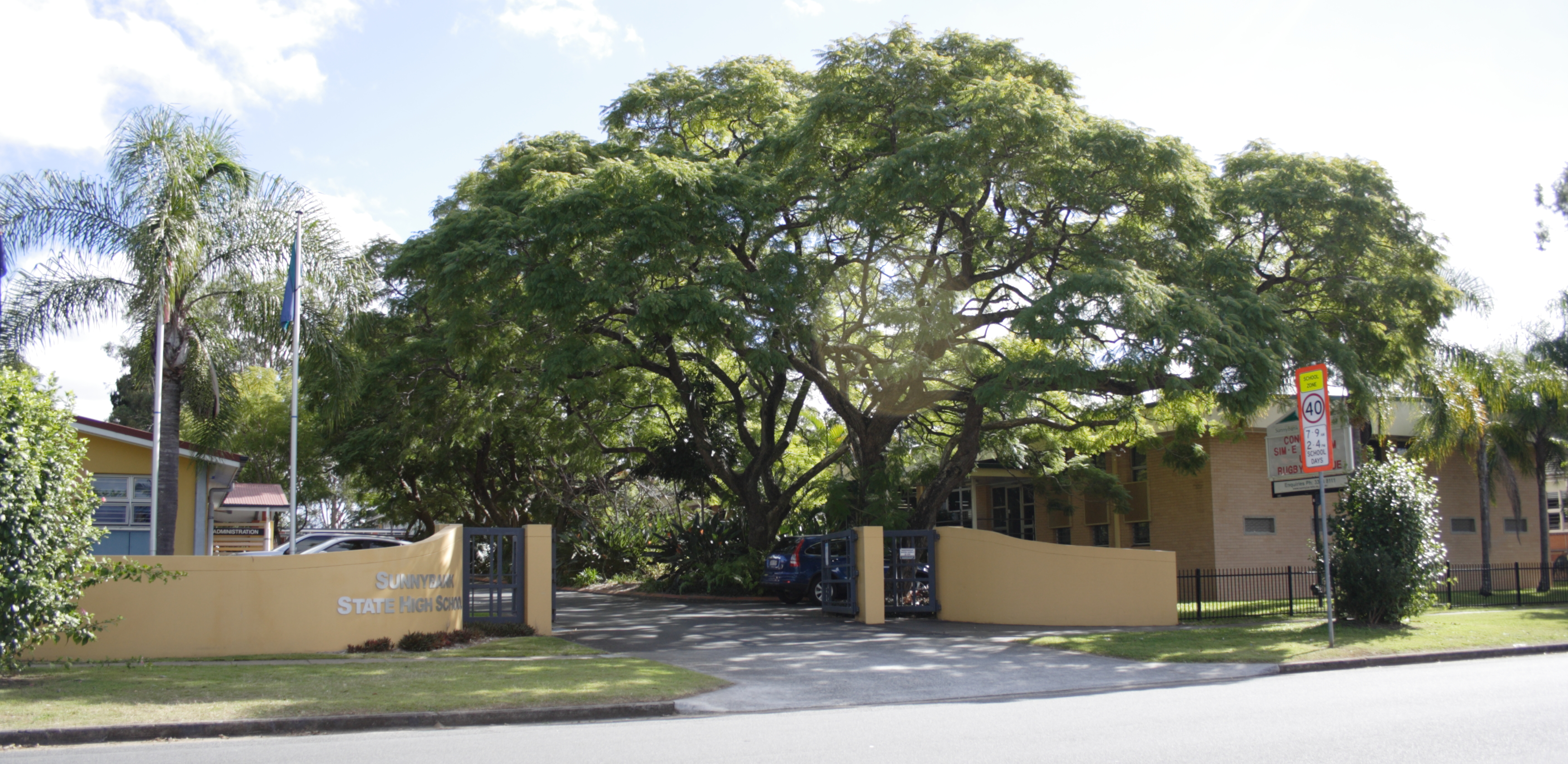
- Boorman Street entrance

Sunnybank State High School is a public co-educational secondary school located in the Brisbane suburb of Sunnybank, Queensland, Australia. It is administered by the Queensland Department of Education, with an enrolment of 666 students and a teaching staff of 61, as of 2023. The school serves students from Year 7 to Year 12.

== History ==
The school opened 29 January 1963, with an enrolment of 121 students. This figure grew to over 1,300 in the 1970s.

In October 2020, a contractor released asbestos particles after penetrating the ceiling and walls of a classroom to install air-conditioning. On 24 November, a Workplace Health and Safety complaint was filed about the matter by a member of the public. Seven weeks after the incident, on 27 November, the school closed four contaminated blocks and sent a letter to parents informing them of the incident. The affected classrooms were ready for use in time for the beginning of the 2021 school year.

== Notable alumni ==
- John-Paul Langbroek, politician,
- Daniel Vidot, wrestler and former rugby league player.

== See also ==
- List of schools in Greater Brisbane
