= Queen Elizabeth II Jubilee Hospital =

Coordinates: 27.5594°S 153.0489°E

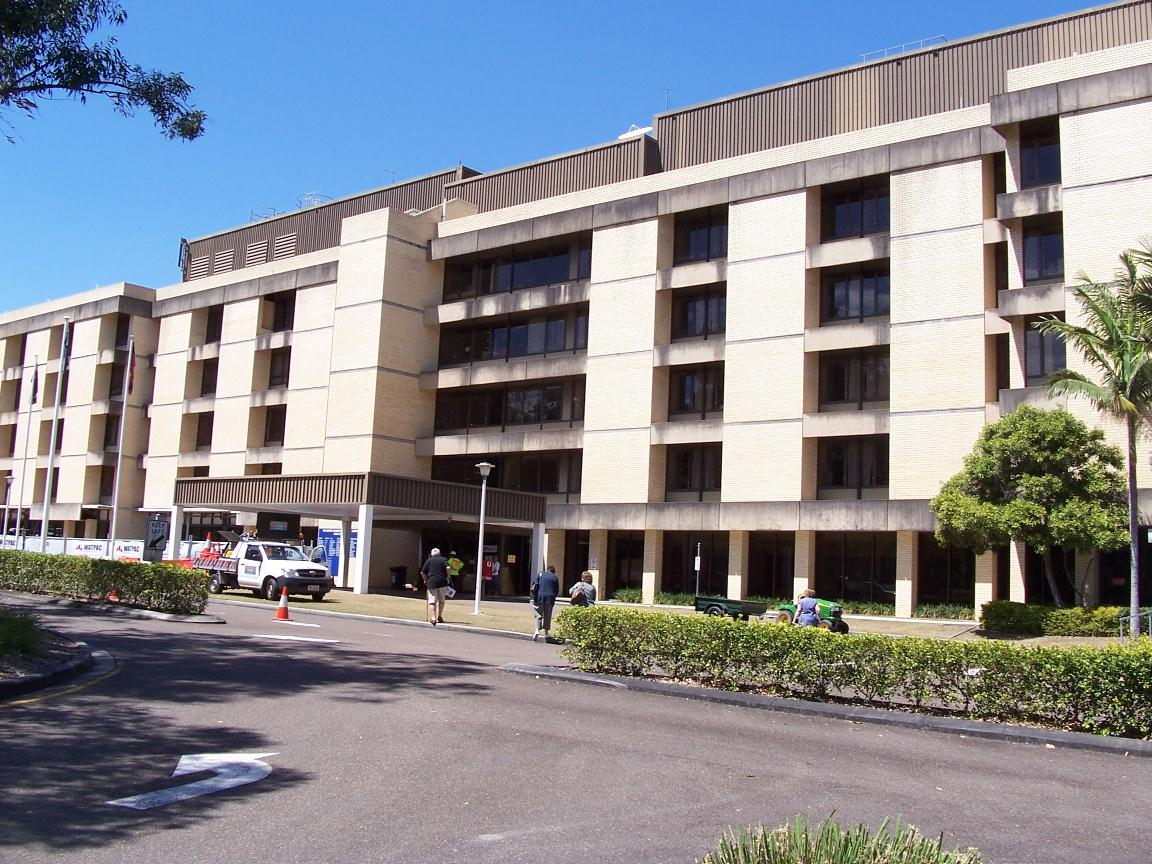
- Queen Elizabeth II Jubilee Hospital

Geography
- Location: Brisbane, South East Queensland, Queensland, Australia

Organisation
- Type: General

History
- Founded: 26 September 1980

Links
- Lists: Hospitals in Australia

Location: Cnr Troughton Rd & Kessels Rd, Coopers Plains QLD 4108

The Queen Elizabeth II Jubilee Hospital (QE II) is a public hospital located in Coopers Plains, Brisbane, Australia. The hospital was officially opened on 26 September 1980.

The hospital originally was developed to be a site for future expansion of the Mater Children's Hospital, a centre for servicing the needs of the Commonwealth Games held nearby and a range of other initiatives that never eventuated. At one point in its history it was almost closed but after vigorous protests by the local community it was reopened and continues as an elective surgical hospital and an active general medical facility.

In 2007 it became part of the newly formed Brisbane South Health District and the QEII Hospital Health Service District was abolished. The district included four hospital services – Beaudesert, Logan, Bayside and QEII.

There was also a proposal to build a stand-alone 'surgicentre' at QEII to provide for increased elective surgery. The eventual outcome was a range of internal redevelopments including an enhanced outpatients area, a new ward, an additional operating theatre and considerable infrastructure upgrades.

In January 2008 it was announced that the federal government would provide funding of $2 Billion for eight medical super clinics as a plan to improve public health services. The QEII Hospital was to be one of the eight hospitals to receive the super clinic boost. By March 2009 no further development of a medical super clinic at QEII had occurred though it was still actively rumoured as a Commonwealth Government initiative. By 2014 there were no longer any plans for a super clinic at QEII.

In late 2008 the Southside Health District and the Princess Alexandra Hospital Health District merged and it was renamed Metrosouth Health Service District.

The QEII as it is known continues to function as before, though the former Community Health Services administrative area was closed and as of February 2009 and an additional ward was opened to increase the elective surgical capacity of the facility.

== Clinical departments ==
- Orthopaedic Surgery, Director Dr Christopher Bell
- Gynaecology, Director Dr Anton Marineanu
- General Surgery, A/Director Dr Geoff Mudouia
- General Medicine, Director Dr Mandeep Mathur
- Intensive Care, Director Dr David Stewart
- Geriatrics and Rehabilitation, Director Dr Amanda Siller
- Emergency Medicine (non-trauma), Director Dr Edward Pink
- Anaesthetics and Pain Management, Director Dr James Hosking
- Urology and Urodynamics, Director Dr Tim Smith
- Library Manager, Dr Jane Simon,

The clinical activities of the hospital centre around lower limb orthopaedic surgery including knee and hip replacements and arthroplasty, elective gynaecological surgery, urodynamics and urological surgery, aged care and rehabilitation as well as a range of general medical and surgical services.

== Management ==
- Executive Director, Gillian Campbell
- Director of Medical Services (Medical Superintendent), Dr Christopher Bell
  - Director of Surgical Services
  - Director of Emergency and Medical Services, Dr Michael Daly
- Director of Nursing Services, Nicki Dennis
  - Director of Nursing, Surgical Services, Amanda Garner
  - Director of Nursing, Medical Services, Julie Finucane
- Director of Allied Health, Leo Ross
  - Director of Physiotherapy, Mark Nelson
  - Director of Occupational Therapy, Ruth Cox
  - Director of Pharmacy, John Parke
  - Director of Dietetics, Sally Courtice
  - Director of Speech Pathology, Katharine Morley-Davies
- Manager, Finance, Joe Byrne CPA
- Manager, Human Resources, Andrew Riddell
- Manager, Corporate Services, Lorraine Munn
- Director of Health Information Management Service, Ava Wong
- Manager, Quality & Safety, Bernie O’Brien
