= James Swanwick =

Australian businessman

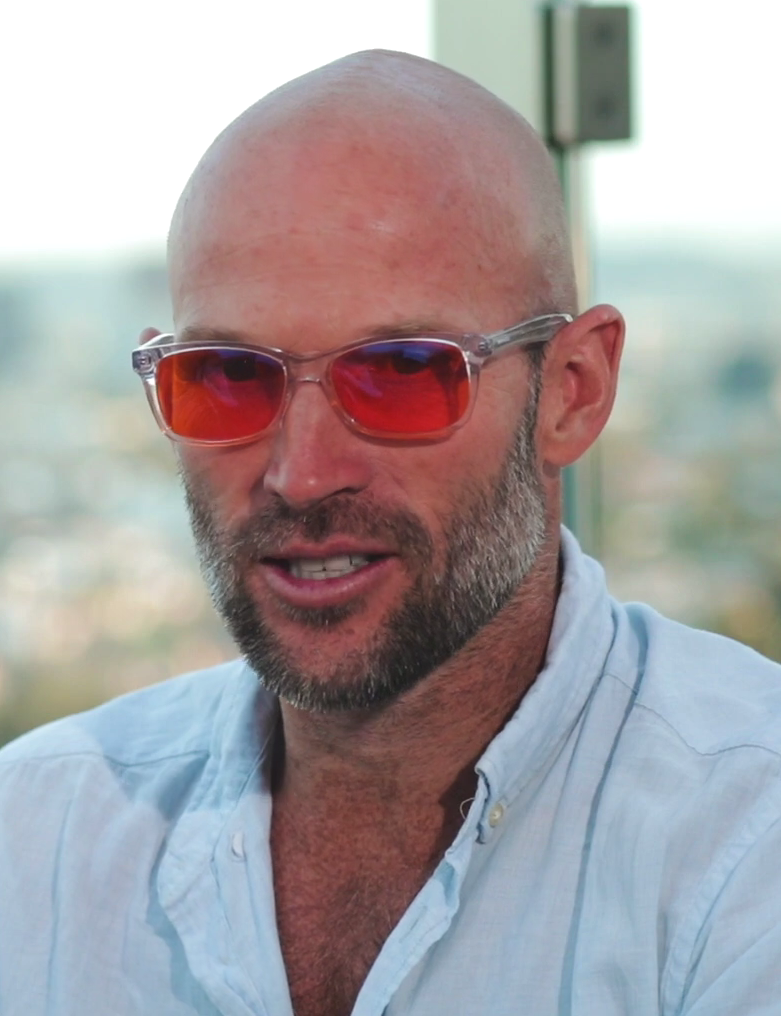
- Swanwick in 2019
- Born: 1975 (age 50–51); Bacchus Marsh, Australia
- Occupations: Investor, entrepreneur, speaker, health & wellness coach
- Known for: Founder of Alcohol Free Lifestyle and co-founder of media agency Sports Entertainment Network

James Swanwick (born 1975) is an Australian-American alcohol free lifestyle advocate, investor, entrepreneur, speaker, health & wellness coach and former SportsCenter anchor on ESPN. He is the founder of entrepreneur and executive coaching organization Alcohol Free Lifestyle, creator of quit drinking program Project 90, founder of blue-light blocking glasses company Swanwick Sleep, co-founder of international media agency Sports Entertainment Network and host of podcast, Alcohol-Free Lifestyle. He has authored three books, including Clear: A Neuroscience-Based Method for Quitting Alcohol Without AA, Rehab or Willpower .

== Career ==
Swanwick was born in Bacchus Marsh, Australia and grew up in Brisbane, Australia. He was educated at the Anglican Church Grammar School and studied at the University of Queensland.

Swanwick has worked as a print, TV and radio journalist. He began his career in 1993 as a reporter at The Courier-Mail in Brisbane, Australia. In 1996, Swanwick won the Queensland Media Award for his interview and exposé on Pauline Hanson, one of Australia’s most publicized and controversial political figures.

Swanwick moved to London in 1999 where he reported for Sky Sports. In 2003, he moved to Los Angeles where he became a Hollywood entertainment correspondent, writing for newspapers and magazines throughout Australia and Britain. In 2010, he began working as a host for ESPN SportsCenter.

Swanwick hosts podcast Alcohol Free Lifestyle, focused on "health, wealth, love and happiness."

He co-founded international media agency, Sports Entertainment Network, which he started with Craig Hutchison in Melbourne, Australia.

In 2015, Swanwick co-founded Swanwick Sleep, with brother Tristan, and founded Alcohol Free Lifestyle, which produces programs including Project 90 to help people reduce or quit drinking.

Also in 2015, Forbes listed Swanwick as one of 25 Professional Networking Experts to Watch.

Swanwick has been interviewed on podcasts Bulletproof Radio and Ben Greenfield Fitness, been featured in Psychology Today and Yahoo Health. and spoken at health conferences including Paleo f(x).
