= Anglican Church Grammar School =

- Coat of arms

Location
- East Brisbane, Queensland; Australia; 27°28′55″S 153°3′14″E

Information
- Type: Independent, single-sex, day and boarding
- Motto: Latin: Alis Aquilae (On an Eagle's Wings)
- Denomination: Anglican
- Established: 1912
- Founder: Canon William Perry French Morris
- Headmaster: Alan Campbell
- Chaplain: The Reverend Sharon Mitchell
- Grades: R–12
- Enrolment: ~1,800
Colours
Blue and grey
- Publication: Eagles' Wings (biannually); The Viking (yearly)
- Alumni: Churchie Old Boys
- Website: churchie.com.au

The Anglican Church Grammar School (ACGS), formerly the Church of England Grammar School and commonly referred to as Churchie, is an independent, Anglican, day and boarding school for boys, located in East Brisbane, an inner suburb of Brisbane, Queensland, Australia.

Founded in 1912 by Canon William Perry French Morris, Churchie has a non-selective enrolment policy and currently caters for approximately 1,800 students from Reception to Year 12, including 150 boarders from Years 7 to 12. It is owned by the Corporation of the Synod of the Diocese of Brisbane.

Churchie is a founding member of the Great Public Schools Association of Queensland (GPS), and is affiliated with the Association of Heads of Independent Schools of Australia (AHISA), the Independent Primary School Heads of Australia (IPSHA), Independent Schools Queensland (ISQ), the Headmasters' and Headmistresses' Conference (HMC) and the Australian Boarding Schools' Association (ABSA). Churchie is also an International Baccalaureate World School offering the Diploma Programme and Primary Years Programme.

Despite its name, the school is not a Grammar School established under either the Grammar Schools Act 1860 or the Grammar School Act 2016, distinguishing it from earlier established Grammar Schools in Brisbane, Ipswich, Rockhampton, Toowoomba, and Townsville. In 2016, the Queensland Parliament defined Grammar Schools to exclude "Anglican Church Grammar School." The legislation forbids a person from "establish[ing] or operat[ing] a non-grammar school under a name that includes the word ‘grammar’" and makes it an offence to "hold out a non-grammar school to be a grammar school." The legislation nevertheless permitted Anglican Church Grammar School to retain its name.

Churchie, widely recognised as one of Australia's most prestigious schools, is among the richest based on earnings and donations from alumni. In 2009, the school raised $30.9 million in fees, charges, parent contributions and other private sources, 26.5 per cent more than any other school in southeast Queensland. In the same year, Churchie also received $7.7 million in donations, primarily from alumni. This figure was the second highest in Australia, surpassed only by the donations to Sydney Grammar School.

== History ==
In 1912, Canon William Perry French Morris and his wife (who held degrees in science and medicine) founded a school called St Magnus Hall at Ardencraig, a suburban house in Church Street (now Jephson Street), Toowong, before relocating it to the present site in East Brisbane in 1918.

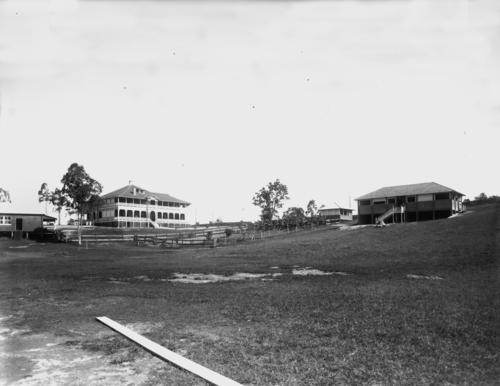
Grounds and buildings, c.1924

Canon Morris assigned Saint Magnus, a Norsemen earl, as the patron saint of the school and had hoped that the students would be referred to as 'Magnates'. It is said that he did not like the nickname 'Churchie' at first, however when it had become commonplace by the 1930s and respected around Queensland he accepted the change.

The school's name was changed to St Magnus Hall Collegiate School For Boys and then to The Cathedral School early in 1913 following the move to a new site at St John's Cathedral in the Brisbane central business district. Thirty-three boys completed the school year that year. In 1916, the land that the school currently stands on was purchased and, in 1918, the foundation stone was laid on the school's current site. From 1916 to 1985, the school was officially known as the Church of England Grammar School (CEGS). Prior to the 1985 school year, the school name was officially changed once again to the Anglican Church Grammar School (ACGS), to reflect the 1981 renaming of the Church of England in Australia to the Anglican Church of Australia. However, the school continues to be popularly known as Churchie.

In 1987, Churchie celebrated its 75th year as a school.

In late 2009, the school began extensive construction work to upgrade its cultural and sporting facilities. Over two years, three new complexes were built at the school's East Brisbane campus: the Barry McCart Aquatic Centre, the David Turbayne Tennis Centre and the $9.9 million Sir John Pidgeon Sports Complex, opened by Governor Penelope Wensley in 2010. In 2011, Morris Hall, the school's "spiritual heart", was upgraded and expanded and the adjacent quadrangle, Magnus Quad, was also relandscaped.

In 2012, Churchie celebrated its 100th year as a school.

In October 2016, School House, the oldest building on site and home to the boarding community, was refurbished. The following year The Centenary Library was opened and as of May 2018 housed Student Services, the Senior School library, classrooms and a research centre focusing on learning environments.

== Patron saint ==
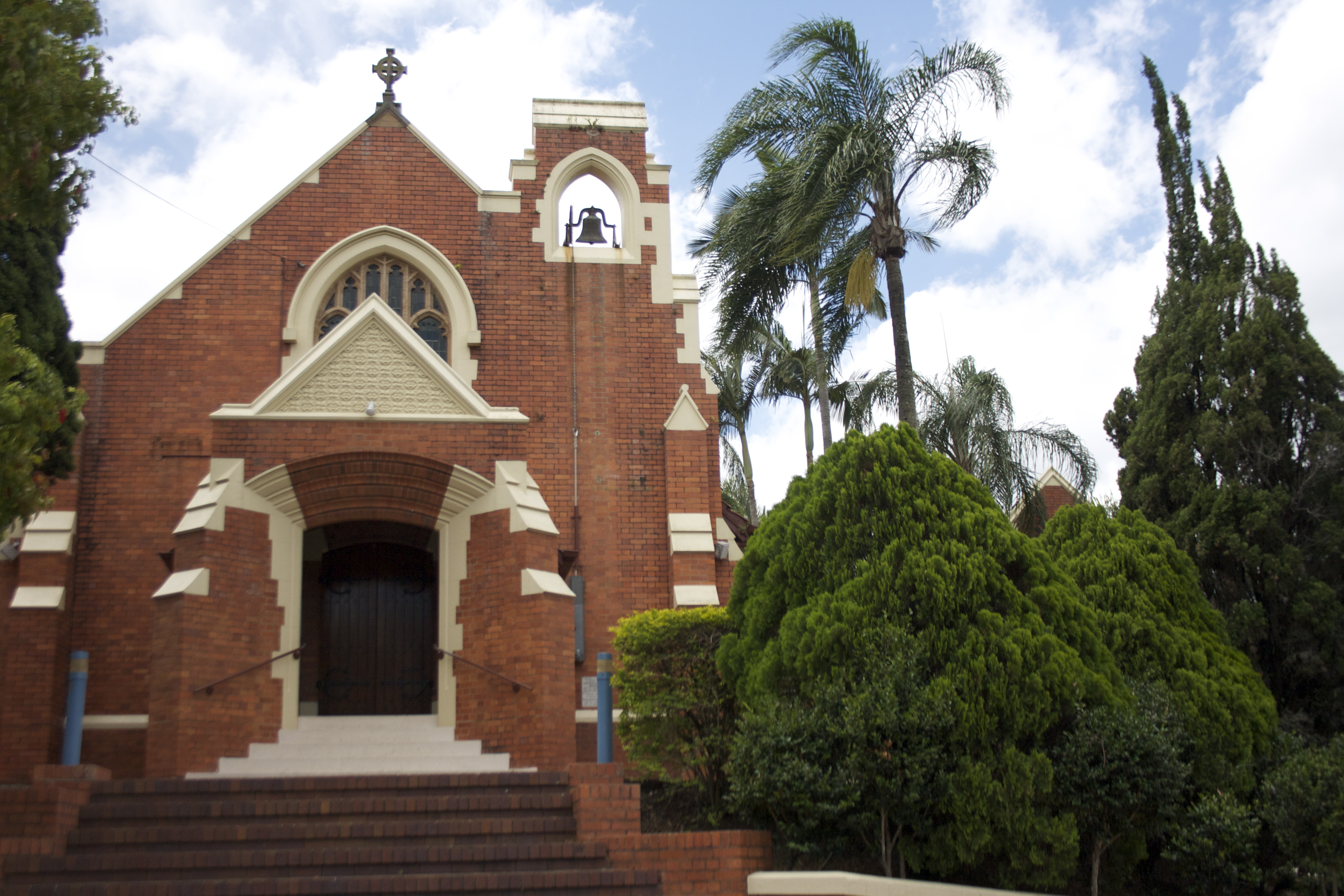
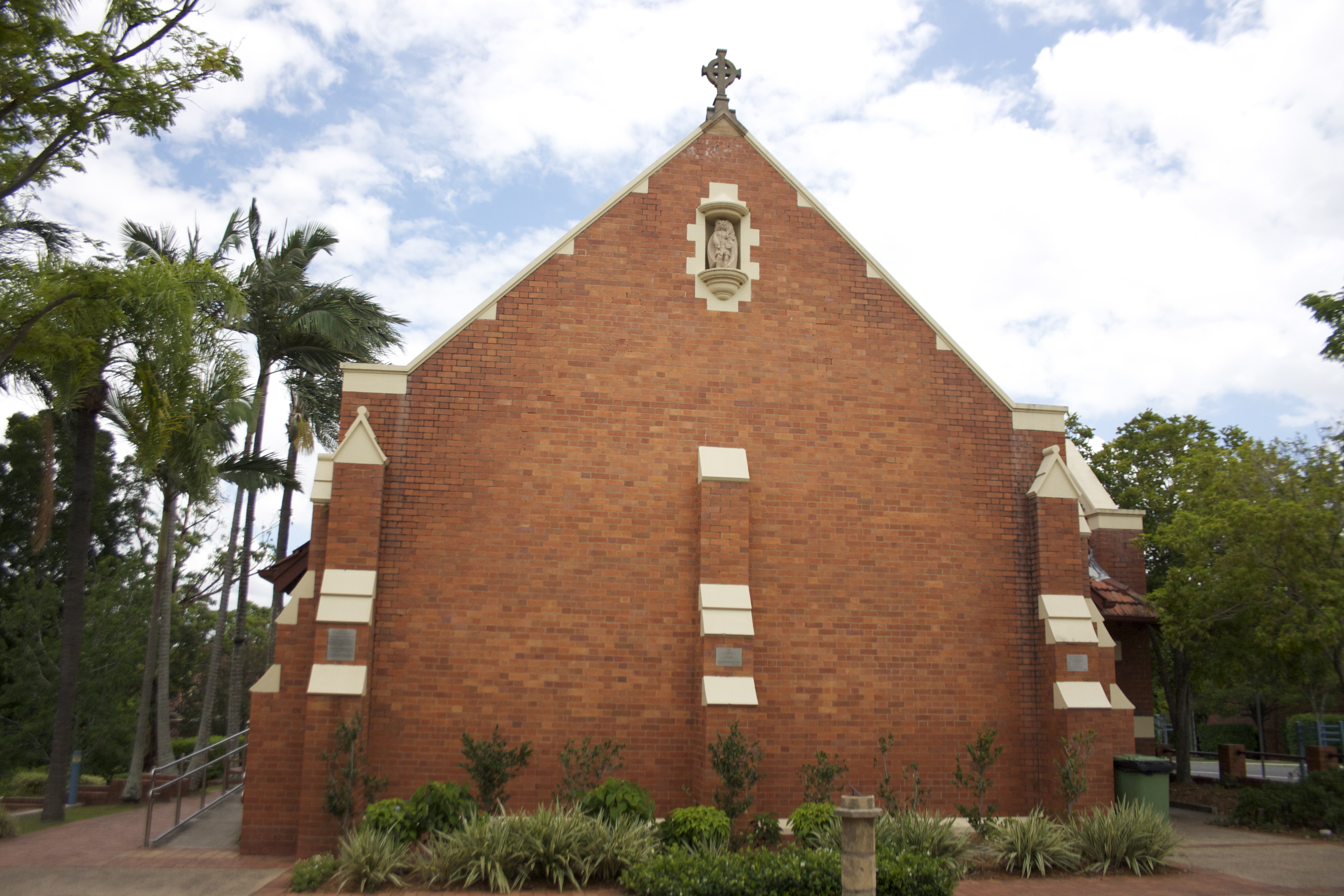
The Canon Jones Memorial Chapel

Canon Morris based much of the school's ethos on its patron saint, St Magnus, a Norsemen earl known for his strength of character and his qualities as an educated Christian man. The Viking tradition is reflected in the school coat of arms, with its shield and battle axes symbolising Viking courage, and its crossed axes signifying self-sacrifice and St Magnus' martyrdom. Many of the school's rowing boats are named after Viking figures, and the school mascot, 'Eric', is also a Viking effigy.

== Controversies and incidents ==
In May 2004, Frederick Roy Hoskins, a former teacher and boarding house head, pleaded guilty to seven child sex offences committed against seven victims aged nine to fifteen between 1947 and 1955. The crimes occurred over a 10-year period at the school.

On the afternoon of 7 December 2007, a fire started in the Lanskey Building between two Year 7 classrooms. The automated fire system set alarms off, and just after 4:30 pm the Queensland Fire and Rescue Service arrived to find two classrooms badly damaged.

During April 2008, there was community debate when students were disallowed from inviting male partners to the school formal. The school's Headmaster referred the matter to the School Council, which released a statement saying that it 'strongly supported the headmaster's position on the school's education programs in social settings'.

In October 2009, the deputy head of the preparatory school, Chris Klemm, who had worked at the school for almost three decades, was stood down due to 'serious allegations' made against him. The Headmaster issued letters to all parents regarding the matter, but kept the allegation, which was revealed in the mid-semester holiday break, confidential. In November 2010, Klemm was convicted of child sex offences and received a jail sentence of five years.

On 18 February 2023, a student pulled a knife at the Churchie rowing sheds after his 'bag of lollies went missing'. Police were called to the scene and the 14-year-old boy was dealt with under the provisions of the Youth Justice Act.

== Headmasters ==
Period	Headmaster
1912–1946	W. P. F. Morris OBE
1947–1969	Harry Roberts OBE
1970–1973	Charles Fisher
1974–1986	Bill Hayward OAM
1987–1997	Christopher Ellis
1998–2003	David Scott
2003–2013	Jonathan Hensman
2014–present	Alan Campbell

== Campus ==
Churchie's twenty-two hectare campus is located in inner-city Brisbane. The school occupies the entire eastern side of Oaklands Parade, a street in East Brisbane, and extends all the way down to the banks of Norman Creek, a tributary of the Brisbane River. The first building on the site was the old boarding house, erected in 1918. Most of the school's buildings are built in the Gothic Scholastic style, characterised by 'decorative, half-timbered gables, red brick face-work, gargoyles and terracotta tiles'. Churchie has all of its sporting and cultural facilities on its East Brisbane campus—including ten playing fields, three swimming pools, two basketball courts, seven tennis courts and gymnasium—on the one campus. The Graham Fowles Boathouse is located approximately one kilometre away in Mowbray Park.

Notable buildings and facilities on the Churchie campus include:

- Morris Hall – Churchie's main social, cultural and musical building
- Magnus Hall and Magnus Quadrangle – the school's main academic building
- The Canon Jones Memorial Chapel – the spiritual centre of the school, named after Canon Thomas Jones, an early supporter of the school. Canon Morris' remains are interred under the chapel's altar
- Darnell – originally the school library, now the School Council Room and The Old Boys Room
- School House – the school's oldest building and boarding headquarters
- The Sir John Pidgeon Sports Complex – contains the school's basketball courts, volleyball courts and gymnasium
- The Hayward Midson Creative Precinct – home to Visual Art, Film and TV and Design and Technology faculties
- The Centenary Library – comprising the Senior School Library, Churchie IT, Student Services, Churchie Archives and museum, Mawson House, the Churchie Research Centre, Churchie Learning Support, The Arches café and various classrooms and multipurpose study spaces.
- The 'Pocket' – a triangle of land bordered by Norman Creek that contains six of the school's playing fields, including the Main Oval
The Anglican Church Grammar School Campus
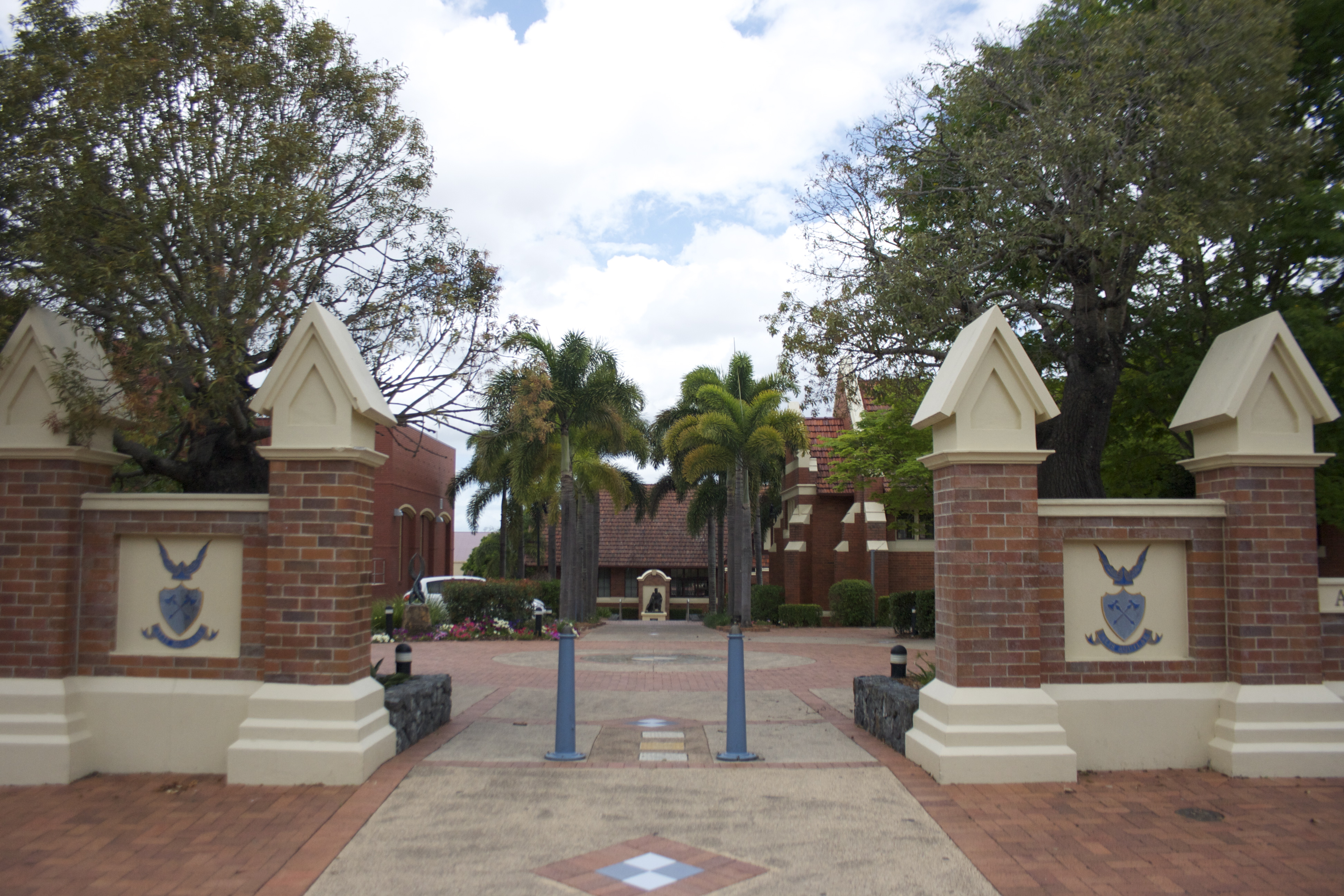
The school gates on Oaklands Parade, East Brisbane

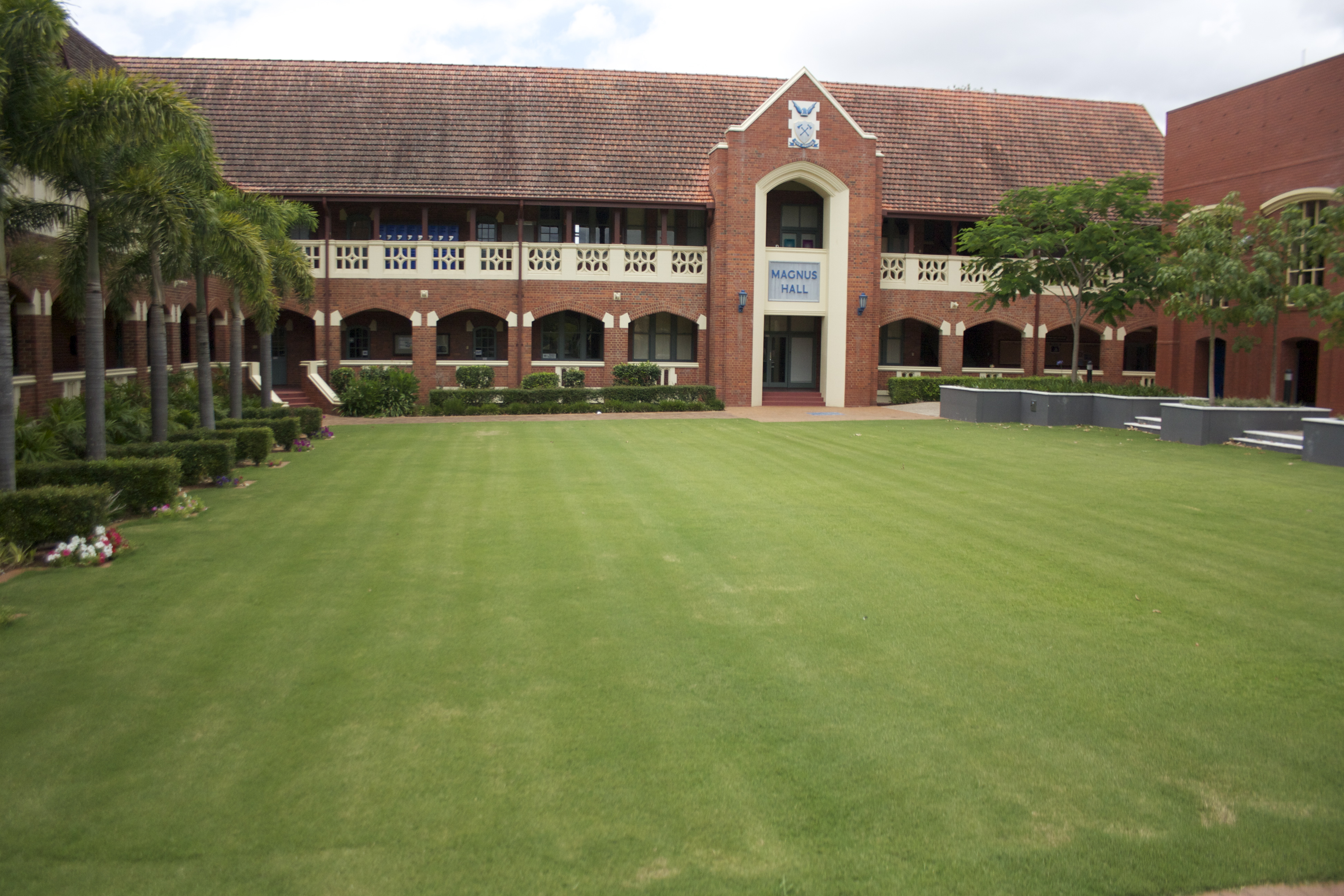
Magnus Hall and Magnus Quadrangle

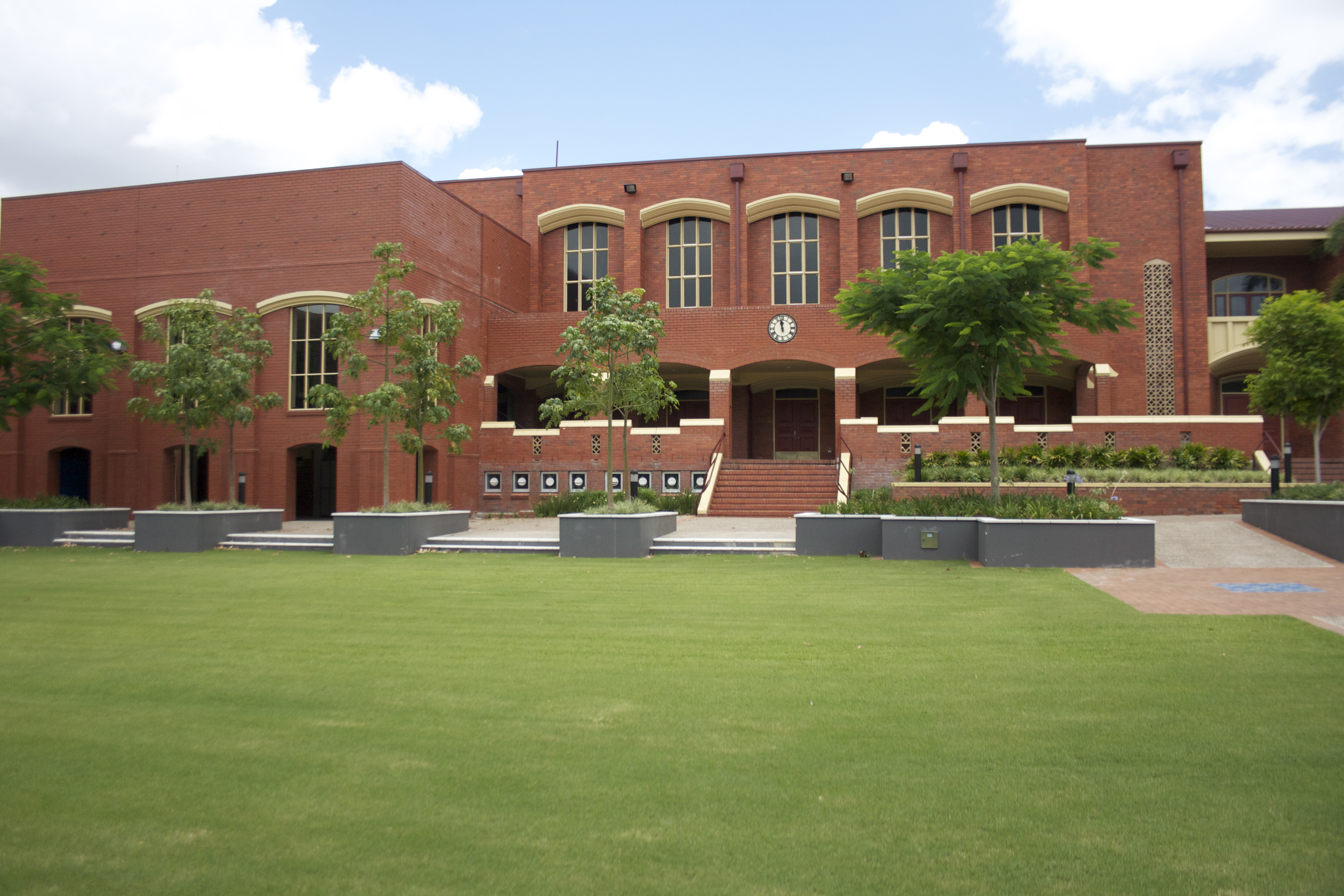
Morris Hall, named after the school's founder, Canon Morris

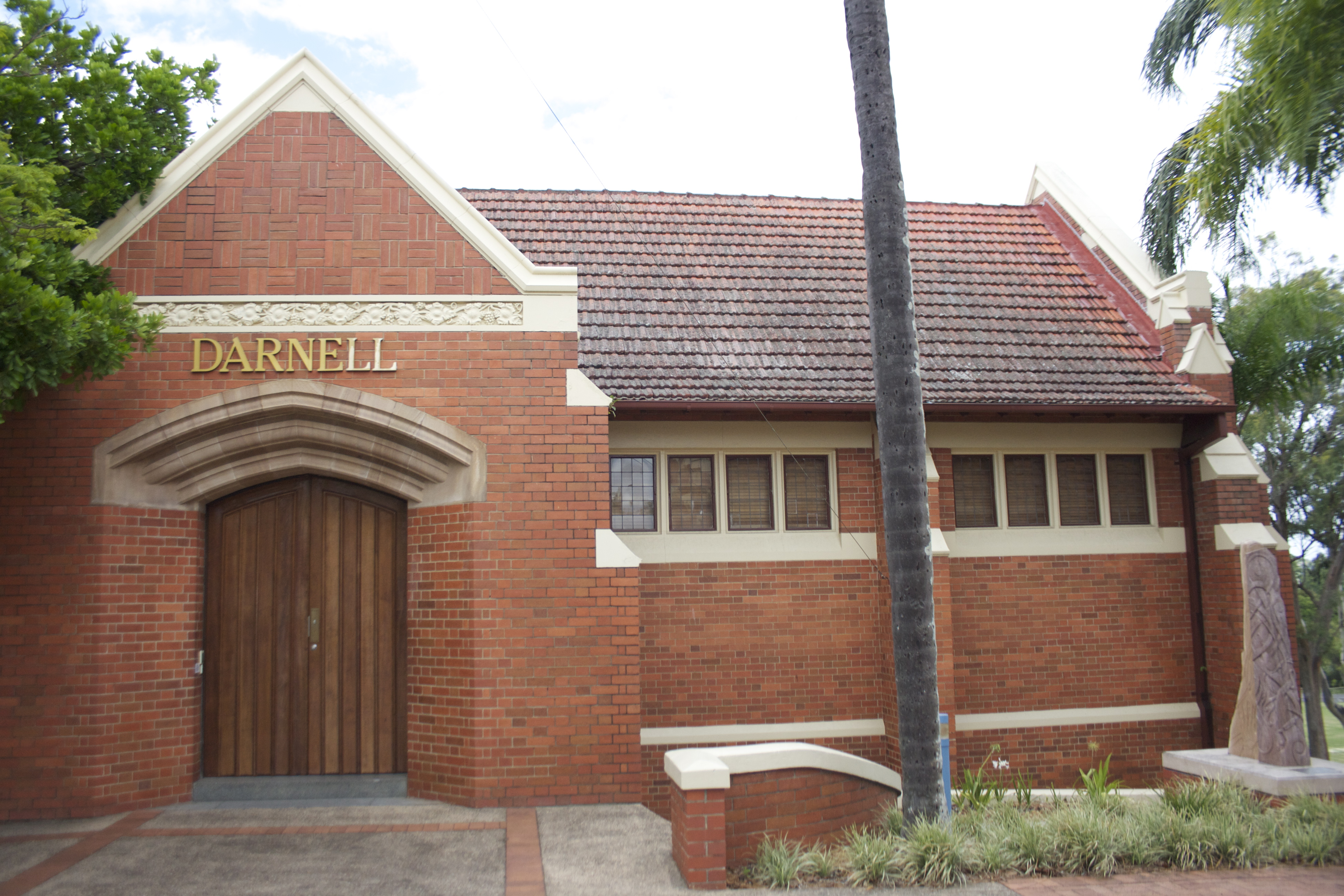
Darnell, the school museum

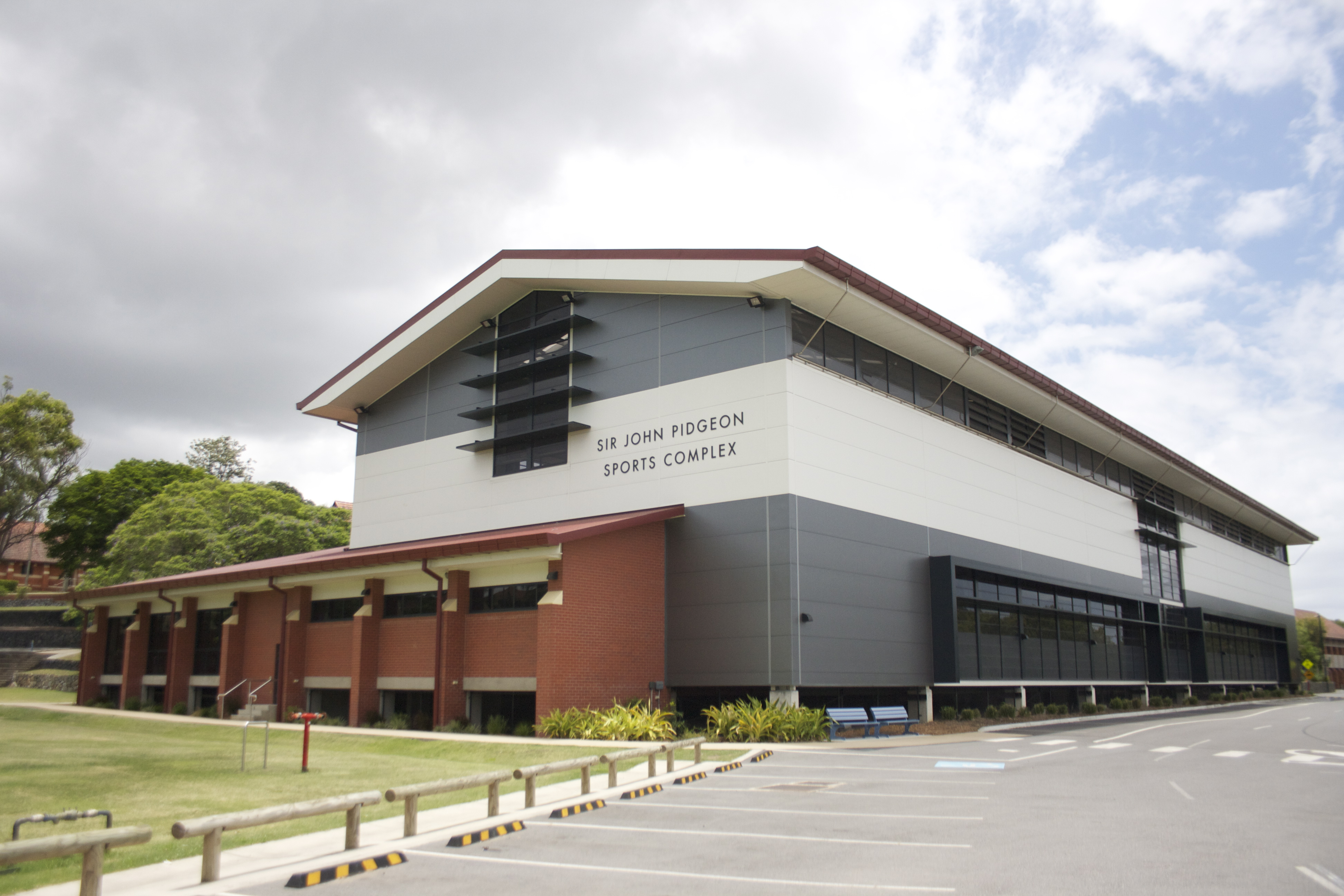
The Sir John Pidgeon Sports Complex

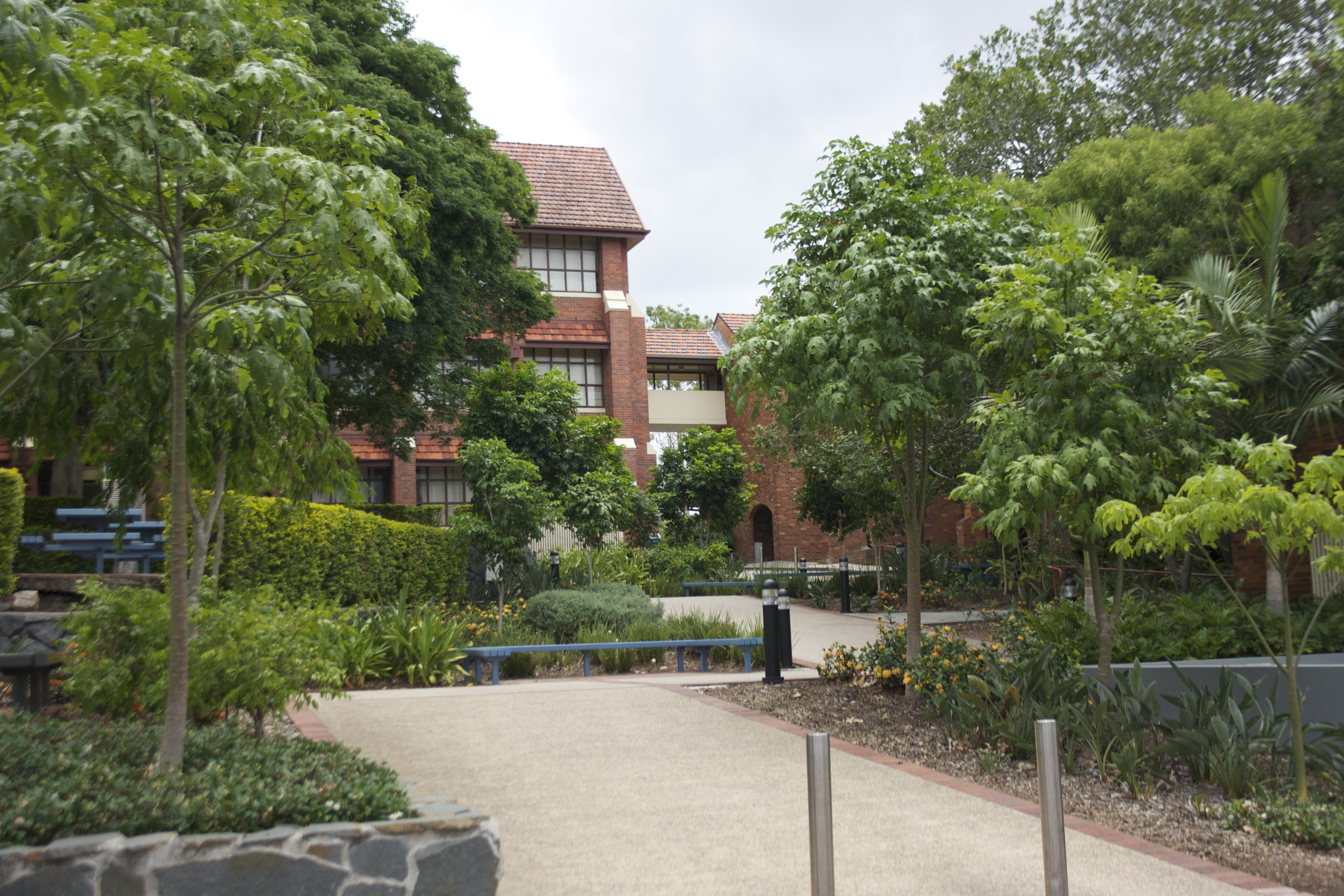
Magnus and Fisher buildings

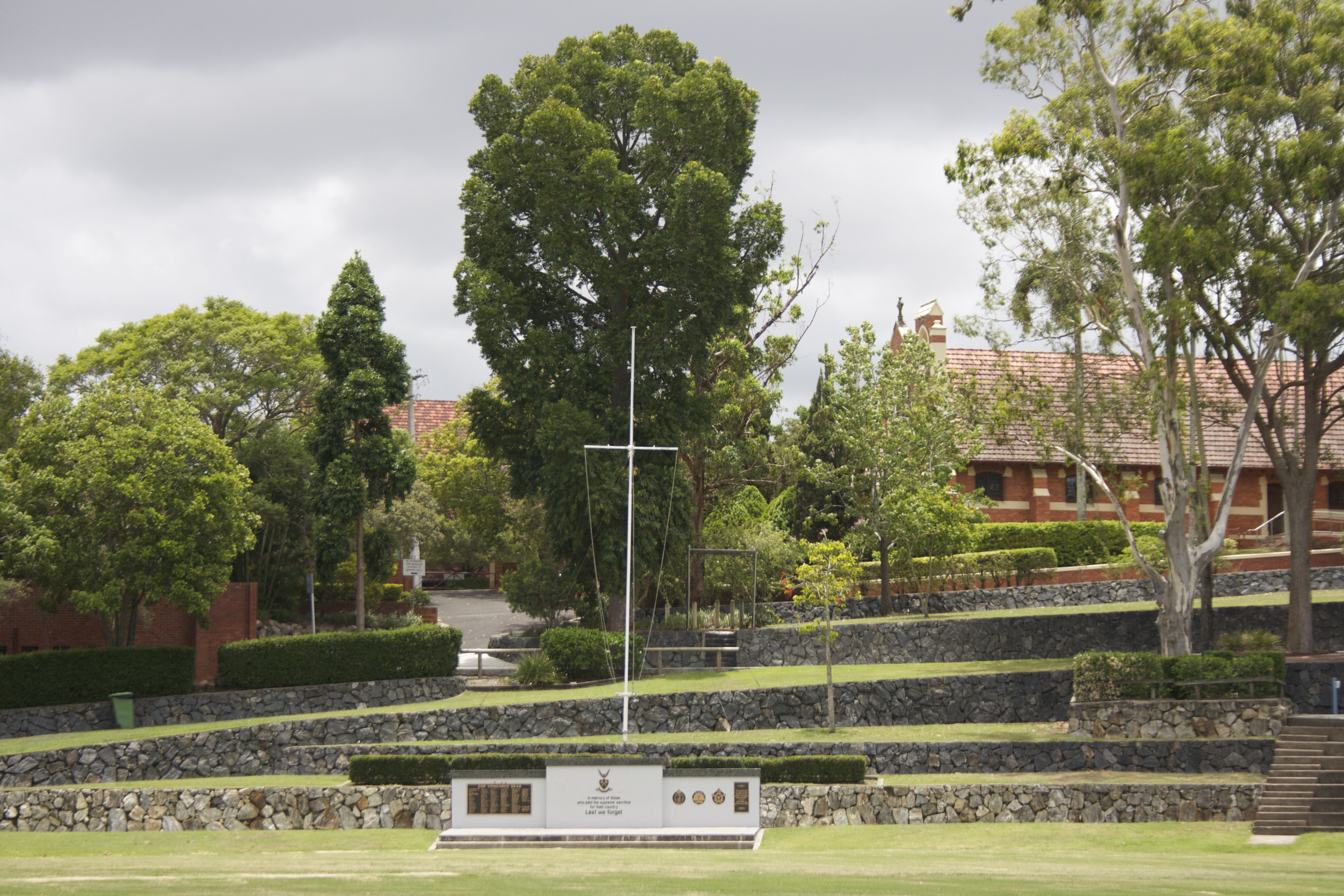
The 'Flat', terraces and the war memorial

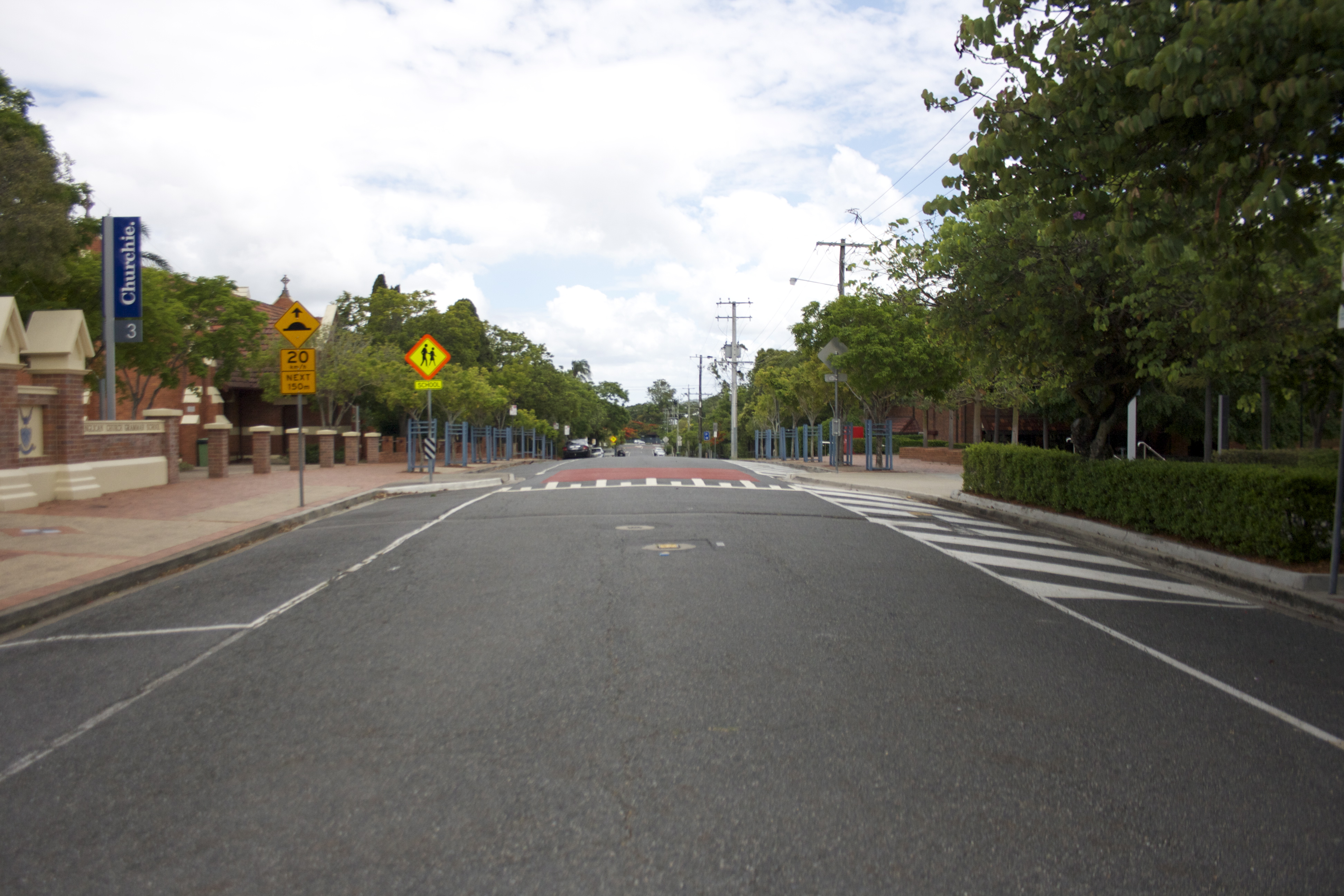
Oaklands Parade

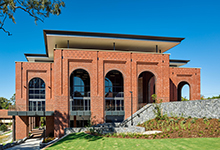
The Centenary Library

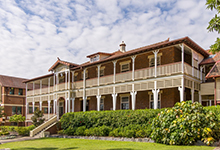
School House

== Curriculum ==
=== Academic ===
Churchie is involved in a number of educational research programmes carried out by various Australian universities, including the universities of Melbourne and Swinburne University of Technology. Its new generation learning space and emotional intelligence programmes are examples of such research-led initiatives.

In 2017, Churchie was authorised by the International Baccalaureate Organisation as an IB World School for the delivery of the Diploma Programme and the Primary Years Programme.

==== Preparatory School ====
Churchie's Preparatory School comprises Reception to Year 6. Students in Years 4, 5 and 6 must lease from the school their own tablet computer as part of Churchie's tablet computer programme. The subjects available to prep students are:

- English
- Mathematics
- Integrated Studies (Science, Humanities and Social Sciences)
- Music
- Visual Arts
- Health and Physical Education
- LOTE (Japanese)
- Religious Education

==== Senior School ====
In 2015, Churchie combined the middle and senior schools into a single Senior School for the secondary school years (7 to 12). Students in Years 7 to 9 use the same curriculum, which focuses on English, mathematics, humanities, science, modern languages (Japanese, Mandarin, Spanish or French), religious education, and health and physical education. Electives include design technology, and visual and media arts, music, drama, geography, engineering technology, advanced science, information technology, film, television and new media and philosophy and critical reasoning. Year 10 is a preparatory year, in which subjects are presented (where possible) as precursors to what can be expected in Years 11 and 12. All subjects are assessed and reported under a criteria-based approach. Year 10 Students study English, mathematics, history, science, religious education, modern languages and history plus three elective subjects. In Years 11 and 12, students study six subjects. English and Mathematics A or Mathematics B are compulsory. The remaining four are drawn from the following list:

- Accounting
- Agricultural Science
- Ancient History
- Biology
- Chemistry
- Drama
- Earth Science
- Economics
- Engineering Technology
- Film, Television and New Media
- Geography
- Information Processing and Technology
- Mathematics C
- Modern History
- Modern languages (Chinese Mandarin, French, Japanese, Spanish)
- Music
- Music Extension (Year 12 only)
- Physical Education
- Physics
- Technology Studies
- Visual Art

Students also receive leadership development training as part of the pastoral learning curriculum and the school's outdoor education programme. Senior students are able to apply their leadership skills during house and co-curricular activities by, for example, mentoring younger students or undertaking duties for the house or School.

=== Sport ===
Churchie offers a range of sporting and cultural activities to all students. The school is a member of the Great Public Schools (GPS) sporting competition and competes in most available sports. Boys of all skill levels are given the opportunity to participate in numerous sports, including: basketball, chess, cricket, cross-country, debating, football, rowing, rugby union, swimming, tennis, track and field, volleyball and water polo. Churchie has been highly successful in the GPS sporting competition winning the top GPS school premiership over all competitions 3 consecutive years (2010, 2011 and 2012). This premiership was known as the Bauman Cup which was first awarded in 1953 and discontinued in 1977. Churchie was awarded the Bauman Cup a record 16 times.

==== Basketball ====
GPS school began competing in an annual basketball premiership since 1986. Since 1986 Churchie has won 8 outright premierships and 2 shared premierships. Churchie's latest premiership was in 2024. The team went undefeated.

School	Premierships	Outright	Shared	Outright years	Shared years
Anglican Church Grammar School	8	6	2	1988, 1989, 2008, 2013, 2014, 2020	1990, 2019

==== Chess ====
Churchie's Premier Chess Team secured the GPS Chess Premiership for two consecutive years in 2018, 2019. Churchie has continued this success in 2024 by securing its fifth consecutive GPS Chess Premiership.

School	Premierships	Outright	Shared	Outright years	Shared years
Anglican Church Grammar School	15	14	1	1997, 1998, 1999, 2000, 2001, 2002, 2008, 2015, 2017, 2018, 2020, 2021, 2022, 2023	2010

==== Cricket ====
Churchie entered the GPS competition in 1922 and played the first match against Gregory Terrace on the 25 February 1922.

It wasn't until 1929 that Churchie won its first premiership (shared with The Southport School). Churchie has won twenty premierships between 1922 and 2020. Churchie's cricket programme has seen numerous successes over its long history, including a premiership win in 2012 after 13 years.

Churchie has also seen its winning percentage across all grades soar from 30 per cent in 2009 to as high as 65 per cent in more recent years. Four Churchie Old Boys have represented Australia—Peter Burge, the Archer brothers Ken and Ron, and Tony Dell.

School	Premierships	Outright	Shared	Outright years	Shared years
Anglican Church Grammar School	19	15	4	1934, 1935, 1940, 1941, 1948, 1950, 1959, 1963, 1967, 1976, 1984, 1996, 1997, 1999, 2012	1929, 1931, 1955, 1962

Cross Country

GPS Cross Country competition began in 1971 when the schools began competing in an annual cross-country championship. Churchie has been the most successful school in GPS Cross Country based premierships with 15 outright premierships and 2 shared premierships. Churchie's most recent premiership was in 2012.

School	Wins	Outright	Shared	Outright years	Shared years
Anglican Church Grammar School	17	15	2	1971, 1972, 1973, 1976, 1977, 1978, 1980, 1983, 1985, 1986, 1987, 1988, 1989, 2009, 2012	1975, 2007

Junior Cross Country

GPS schools began competing in an annual Junior Cross Country carnival since 2014. Churchie has had high success in Junior Cross Country being the first school to win the inaugural GPS Championships event for Year 5–7 in 2014. Churchie has the second most premierships with 4, behind Nudgee College's 7. Churchie's most recent Junior Cross Country premiership was in 2023.

School	Wins	Outright	Shared	Outright years	Shared years
Anglican Church Grammar School	4	3	1	2014, 2022, 2023	2019

==== Debating ====
Churchie has won the GPS Debating Premiership competition three times since it commenced in 2002, winning in 2007, 2012 and 2020. Churchie's most recently premiership was in 2022.

School	Premierships	Outright	Shared	Outright years	Shared years
Anglican Church Grammar School	4	4	0	2007, 2012, 2020, 2022	

==== Football ====
In 2019, Churchie's First XI achieved the school's first-ever GPS Football premiership since the competition began in 1991. Churchie First XI most recent Football premiership was won in 2024.

School	Wins	Outright	Shared	Outright years	Shared years
Anglican Church Grammar School	2	2	0	2019, 2024	

==== Rowing ====
Churchie's rowing history dates back to its establishment in 1912. Rowing was initially based at the Toowong Rowing Club, near the school's original grounds. Later, in 1917, the school built its own boatshed and rowing facilities at Norman Creek. Shortly after the opening of the Norman Creek boatshed, the school began a rowing competition between day and boarding students, held over a 5/8-mile course, which has been held sporadically since 1920. In 1936, the Elder Hunter boatshed was built on the banks of the Brisbane River in Mowbray Park, East Brisbane. The school's rowing program now operates from the Graham Fowles Boathouse, built in 2005 on the site of the old boatshed.

Since 1918, Churchie has entered both quads and eights in the Queensland Head of the River, Queensland's premier high school rowing competition. From 1918 to 1954, the O'Connor Cup for the Open 1st VIII race was contested in quads. Churchie won the cup six times in quads (1922, 1926, 1936, 1939, 1940 and 1941). Since the introduction of eights in 1955, Churchie has won ten times (1963, 1969, 1971, 1973, 1975, 1998, 2004, 2005, 2010 and 2012). The School has won the Old Boys' Cup, awarded to the school with the greatest number of points, a total of nine times (in 1990, 1991, 1999, 2004, 2005, 2006, 2019, 2020 and 2021) since the award's inception in 1988.

In 2012, the Open 1st VIII participated in the Princess Elizabeth Challenge Cup at the Henley Royal Regatta in the United Kingdom, the first Churchie crew to do so.

Head Of River
School	Wins
Anglican Church Grammar School	16

Old Boys' Cup
School	Wins
Anglican Church Grammar School	9

==== Rugby ====
Initially, rugby league was played by the GPS schools; only in 1928 did they convert to rugby union. With seventeen premierships as of 2014, Churchie has always been one of the strongest schools in the rugby competition. Only Nudgee College has won the premiership a greater number of times. Churchie's 2005 undefeated premiership-winning 1st XV contained two future Australia players: David Pocock and Quade Cooper. Twenty-four Churchie students have been selected for the Australian Schoolboys national rugby union team, the highest level of schoolboy rugby in Australia, since the team's inception in 1973. In 2010, the school was identified as one of the 'nurseries of Australian schoolboy rugby' by the Australian Schools Rugby Union (ASRU). In all, sixteen Churchie boys have gone on to become Wallabies:

- Keith Bell
- Walter Bennett
- Quade Cooper
- David Crombie
- Owen Edwards
- David Hillhouse
- Nigel Holt
- Gavan Horsley
- Kerry Larkin
- Don Lowth
- Lloyd McDermott
- David Pocock
- David Rathie
- David Taylor
- Ross Teitzel
- Ric Trivett

School	Premierships	Outright	Shared	Outright years	Shared years
Anglican Church Grammar School	19	13	6	1939, 1949, 1951, 1955, 1957, 1959, 1962, 1963, 1967, 1982, 1999, 2014, 2015	1950, 1954, 1974, 2003, 2005, 2022

==== Swimming ====
GPS Schools began competing in an annual swimming competition since 1918.Churchie won multiple swimming premierships with 21 outright premierships since the competition began. Churchie's most recent premiership was in 2014.

School	Wins	Outright	Shared	Outright years	Shared years
Anglican Church Grammar School	21	21	0	1930, 1937, 1939, 1940, 1941, 1943, 1944, 1945, 1946, 1947, 1948, 1949, 1950, 1956, 1960, 1961, 1962, 1963, 1964, 1965, 2014	

Junior Swimming

Junior GPS Swimming Championships began in 2014. Churchie won the Junior GPS Swimming Championships a total of four times (2014, 2015, 2020, 2021). Junior Swimmers range from 10 Years & Under to 12 Years & Under.

School	Wins	Outright	Shared	Outright years	Shared years
Anglican Church Grammar School	4	4	0	2014, 2015, 2020, 2021	

==== Tennis ====
The first tennis captain was appointed in 1921 and tennis courts were built that same year.

These courts remained in service (with extensions and modifications) until 2009 when the Sir John Pidgeon Sports Complex was built on the site. Other courts were also established for a time behind School House.

Since 1991, Churchie's school tennis side has been coached by Ian Malpass. During his time at the school he has coached multiple professional tennis players such as John Milman, Adam Walton, and Colin Sinclar.

Churchie now has 11 courts for the boys and community to use. In 2011 the David Turbayne Tennis Centre opened. It has seven fully-lit courts with Rebound Ace (rubber) surfaces. Churchie also has access to the council-owned Hazel Millman four tennis hard courts, which are located in Heath Park.

Churchie has won the GPS Tennis Premiership 11 times since the competition began in 1918.

School	Wins	Outright	Shared	Outright years	Shared years
Anglican Church Grammar School	11	8	3	1958, 1960, 1961, 1962, 1996, 1997, 2004, 2005	1941, 1948, 1957

Track and Field

School	Wins	Outright	Shared	Outright years	Shared years
Anglican Church Grammar School	21	19	2	1923, 1943, 1944, 1949, 1952, 1953, 1954, 1956, 1957, 1958, 1959, 1960, 1961, 1962, 1963, 1964, 1965, 1973, 1974	1929, 1935

=== Junior Track and Field ===
Schools have competed in an annual athletics competition since 2014 Churchie has won 2 premierships and is second behind Nudgee College.

School	Wins	Outright	Shared	Outright years	Shared years
Anglican Church Grammar School	2	2	0	2014, 2018	

Water Polo

Water polo began at Churchie in 1996, and in 1997, Churchie entered its first competition with five teams.

Churchie won the 2003 Southern Skies Open Championships and the 2012 Queensland Schools Tournament and was runner-up in the 2004 Tasman Cup Tournament, which featured entries from interstate and New Zealand.

Even though water polo is not a recognised GPS sport, in 2009, 2010 and 2017 the Open Firsts emerged as undefeated premiers in the Independent School Competition.

Churchie students who have represented Australia at various levels include William Armstrong, James Broadley, Tom Culleton, Michael Dance, Tim Dance, Nick Godfrey, Duncan Greenbank, Stewart Greenbank, Zac Hudson, Tyler Sinclair, Tom Woudwyk and Alex Yeates.

==== Volleyball ====
In 1994, volleyball became a GPS sport and Churchie fielded teams in the U13, U15 and Open divisions. The first GPS Volleyball Premiership won by Churchie was in 1998.

In 2022, Churchie Volleyball included 271 players across 29 teams from Years 7 through 12. Teams commence trials and pre-season games in Term 4 with the GPS Volleyball competition played through Term 1.

The Churchie First VI were GPS Premiers and holders of the Peter Donaldson Memorial Trophy in 1998, 2016, 2017, 2018 and 2020. From 2016 to 2018, the Churchie First VI remained undefeated for three consecutive years.

Most recently, Churchie has won back to back undefeated Volleyball Premierships (2023, 2024).

School	Wins	Outright	Shared	Outright years	Shared years
Anglican Church Grammar School	7	6	1	1998, 2016, 2017, 2018, 2023, 2024	2020

=== Former Sports ===
Gymnastics

Schools have competed in an annual gymnastics competition from 1915 to 2021. Churchie had won 16 outright premierships since 1915 to 2021 and is second behind Brisbane Grammar School. Churchie no longer consistently compete in gymnastics (occasionally, small teams/individuals have represented these schools at the championships). The GPS Gymnastics has been officially discontinued as a GPS sport after the 2020 GPS Championships, however the GPS Gymnastics Foundation Cup has been contested since 2021, where Churchie may compete.

School	Wins	Outright	Shared
Anglican Church Grammar School	16	16	0

Sailing

An annual sailing competition was instigated in the GPS in 2000. Churchie has had success in Sailing from 2000 to 2021, winning four times, Churchie has the third most wins behind Brisbane Grammar School and The Southport School. Sailing has been officially discontinued after the 2020 GPS Championships discontinued by the GPS Association. The GPS Sailing Foundation Cup has been contested since 2021.

School	Wins	Win years
Anglican Church Grammar School	4	2001, 2004, 2009, 2010

=== Culture ===
==== Music ====
The school's music program includes a symphony orchestra, an assortment of bands and choirs and a choral dectet. Individual tuition is available for students studying an instrument or voice and speech. Churchie also provides the choristers for St John's Cathedral.

In July 2000, the Churchie Symphony Orchestra performed the prelude music and the national anthem at A Service for Australia in Westminster Abbey, London, to commemorate the Federation of Australia.

Churchie runs annual musicals in conjunction with Somerville House. Productions have included Peter Pan (2017), Grease (2016), Alice in Wonderland (2015), How to Succeed in Business Without Really Trying (2014), The Sound of Music (2013), Oliver! (2012) and Charlie And The Chocolate Factory (2024). The Stage Crew is a group of school students who work on productions, assemblies, service events, dances and other activities that require technical organisation.

==== Art and media ====
Each year, the school showcases the work of its Film, TV and New Media students at the Churchie Awards in Media (CAM). Similarly, Visual Art students display their work at CART, the Churchie Art showcase.

The churchie national emerging art prize was established in 1987 as an initiative of the school. From 2010 until 2019, the school had a partnership with the Griffith University Art Gallery at the Queensland College of Art, with staff members from the school sitting on the committee as well as developing educational materials to complement the exhibition of finalists, aimed at school-age students as of 2013.

Since 2019 and as of 2022, the Institute of Modern Art in Brisbane has hosted the awards.

=== Service ===
Community service, along with scholastic attainment, spiritual awareness and personal growth, is one of the four tenets of the school. Churchie students are regularly involved in a number of charitable events including doorknocks, fundraisers (especially for the Leukaemia Foundation's World's Greatest Shave), nursing home visits and mobile Blood Bank donations. The school also conducts international service tours where students assist local schools and community organisations. Recent international service tours have visited India, China, Vanuatu and Samoa. On the final day of Term two, a Prep School Billy Cart Race is held to support World Vision. One of the most important service activities for the year is the Sony Foundation Children's Holiday Camp Program, where students from Years Eleven and Twelve care for a child with special needs during the September Holidays. In 2012, Churchie won the Queensland Community Foundation's Corporate Community Philanthropist of the Year Award for donating over $2 million over the past two decades to charitable foundations.

== House system ==
As with most Australian schools, Churchie uses a house system. Each student is a member of one of its eleven houses, and competes in inter-house events. Churchie's inter-house competition includes swimming, cross-country, track and field, trivia, lightning chess and singing. Points are awarded based on a house's participation and position. In addition to the Inter-House Cup awarded at the end of the year, shields are awarded to the house that comes first in each event. Canon Morris started Churchie's house system in 1935.

=== Day houses ===
Day students from the middle and senior schools belong to one of nine-day houses. (The preparatory school has four houses, all of which are day houses: Jutes, Angles, Saxons and Danes.)

Biggs

Biggs house was named after E. E. Biggs, a member of the first school council. He attended the school from 1918 to 1923. The Biggs family's association with the school continues to the present day. The house motto is Semper Conemur ("Always Striving"). Colours: blue and white.

Casey

Casey house was founded in 1971 and named in honour of Richard Gardiner Casey (1890–1976), later Baron Casey of Berwick, a distinguished Australian diplomat, politician and Governor-General of Australia. The house motto, Vis et Unitas, is usually translated as "Progress Through Unity". The house coat of arms incorporates themes from Casey's own coat of arms, with the addition of the crossed Viking swords. Colours: gold and royal purple (Baron Casey's own colours).

Grenfell

Grenfell, founded in 1935, was one of the first four-day houses at Churchie. It was named after Sir Wilfred Thomasson Grenfell, who was born at Parkgate, England, in 1865. Grenfell was a doctor whose love of the sea and interest in boating led him to becoming a master mariner. A lecturer of his suggested he join a large fishing fleet as their doctor. Within five years he had encouraged the fishermen to stop drinking alcohol and Queen Victoria's interest in his successful persuasion of the crew led to her presenting the fleet with its first hospital boat. In 1891, Grenfell sailed to Cape St. John in the North Atlantic. He was mobbed by people who needed medical attention. The following spring he returned to Labrador with two doctors and nurses, where he set up two hospital bases for the Eskimos who populated Labrador. A third hospital was set up at St. Anthony in about 1898. Sir Wilfred Grenfell gave the school permission to use his personal motto, Loyal Devoir, and coat of arms when the house was established. Colours: red and gold.

Hillary

Hillary house was named by the late headmaster Charles Fisher, who looked for men who had achieved success in their chosen field. He chose Sir Edmund Hillary, who, in 1953, was one of the first men ever to climb Mount Everest. The house colours and crest were chosen by the first students of Hillary from designs submitted by students. The crest incorporated the symbols of knighthood—a knight's helmet, a castle, and a fist pointing upward. The house motto is Semper Sursum ("Ever Upward"). Colours: black and gold.

Kingsley

Kingsley was one of the original four houses. It held both day and boarding students until 1950, when the two boarding houses were created. In 1971, Kingsley House was divided to create Biggs and Hillary houses. Canon Morris chose Charles Kingsley, a man he considered a Christian with a Viking's courage, as the house's patron. History revealed Charles Kingsley to have been a man who practiced his Christian beliefs and followed his social conscience to help the less fortunate, with whom he chose to live. The Kingsley house motto, Age Quod Agis, translates loosely as "Do What You Do Well". Colours: black and white.

Magnus

Magnus was one of the original four-day houses. The house is named after St Magnus, Churchie's patron saint. The house's coat of arms is a simple shield with St. Magnus holding a sword and a palm of martyrdom. This image of St Magnus is from a stained-glass window in St Magnus Cathedral in Orkney and dates back probably to the thirteenth century. The house motto is Sibi Fidelis ("Be Faithful To Oneself"). Colours: maroon and royal blue.

Mansfield

Mansfield was named after Sir Alan Mansfield, a distinguished barrister and former judge, Chief Justice and Governor of Queensland. Sir Alan attended the school when it was known as St. Magnus Hall. The house crest borrows heavily from the Mansfield family coat of arms. The house motto is "Steadfast". Colours: white and blue.

Mawson

Mawson house was named after Sir Douglas Mawson, a distinguished geologist and Antarctic explorer, who became famous for his discovery of the South Magnetic Pole in 1908 and his ill-fated second journey to Antarctica in 1911. He continued to visit and explore Antarctica up until 1931. The house motto is Alis Austri ("On the Wings of the South Wind"). The Mawson coat of arms includes the vessel Mawson used on his voyages south and the Southern Cross. Colours: red and green.

Nansen

Nansen was one of the original four houses, named after Fridtjof Nansen, a scientist, explorer and humanitarian. The Nansen house crest was established at Churchie in 1938; inscribed on the crest is the motto Fram, which means "Forward". Colours: green and white.

=== Boarding houses ===
There are two boarding houses, both based on the school grounds.

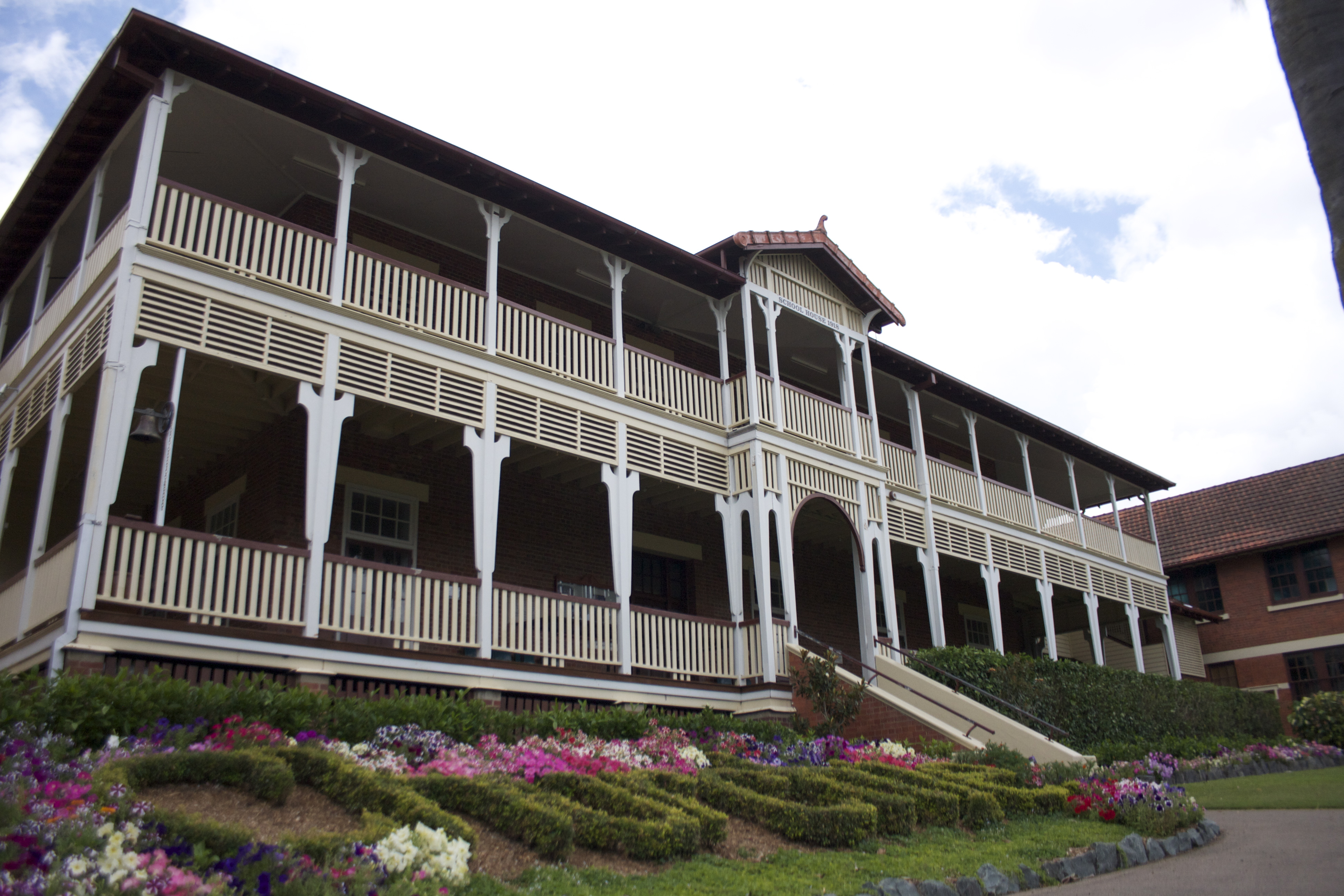
The old School House, established 1918, is used now for boarding activities

Gerald

Gerald house was opened in 1934, as the need for new boarding accommodation grew. Prior to 1959, boarders took part in competitive sport as members of a day house. This changed in 1950, when the boarding houses became sporting competitors in their own right. The house was named after Gerald Sharp, Archbishop of Brisbane (1921–1933). The house crest shows the Bishop's mitre which symbolises the connection with Archbishop Sharp; the large star signifies God; the two smaller stars king and country, and the five small stars signify truth, honesty, duty, comradeship, and charity. The house's motto is Fideliter Et Constanter, meaning "Faithfully and Constantly". Colours: green and yellow.

Goodwin

Goodwin house was opened in 1928, and named after Lieutenant General Sir John Goodwin, most famous for his medical work in World War I. Goodwin took interest in the progress of the school while he was Governor of Queensland. The house motto is Fide et Virtute, meaning "By Faith and Courage". The Goodwin house crest is the family crest of Sir John Goodwin, who suggested it be adopted by the house when he granted permission for it to be named Goodwin. Colours: red and gold.

=== Former houses ===
In 2006, Churchie lessened the number of school houses in the inter-house competition. Five houses—three-day and two boarding—were abolished, reducing the total number of houses from sixteen to eleven. The three-day houses removed were Alban (dark blue and sky blue), Schonell (red and blue) and Halse (gold and light green). Donaldson (blue and gold) and Strong (gold and black) are the two former boarding houses.

== Student bodies and leadership groups ==
A number of student and leadership groups exist at the school. The Prefect Body is a group of seniors selected by the students and teachers of the school to lead the student body in all aspects of Churchie life. It is led by the three school vice-captains and the School Captain, who are collectively known as the Student Executive. The Head Boarder is the leader of the boarding students. The Student Council is a student organisation, led by the Speaker of the House (a school vice-captain) and the two managers-of-business, consisting of the assembly and the cabinet. Service Coordinators is a group of seniors selected within their houses and led by the President of Service who encourage service within the school.

Since 2008, boys in Year Nine must participate either in weekly community service, scouting or the Tri-Service Cadets program. Boys must commit to these until the end of Year Nine. The school also operates the Duke of Edinburgh's Awards and in November 2014, Prince Edward, accompanied by Governor of Queensland Paul de Jersey, visited the school to promote the award as part of an Australian tour.

== Notable alumni ==
Old Boys' Association Logo

Alumni of Anglican Church Grammar School are known as 'Old Boys', and may elect to join the school's alumni association, the Churchie Old Boys' Association. Notable Churchie Old Boys include:

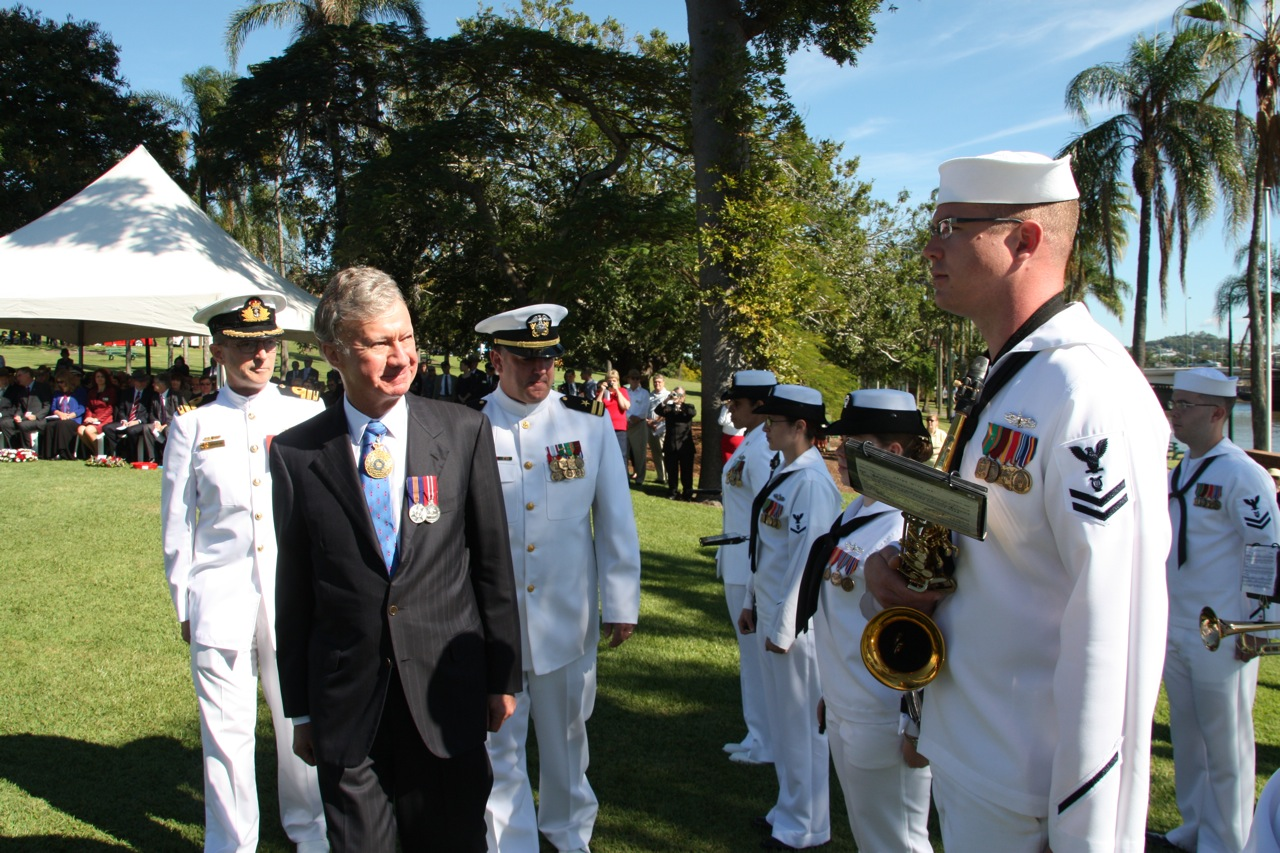
Paul de Jersey

=== Public service and the law ===
- Paul de Jersey, AC, QC – former Governor of Queensland (2014–2021) and Chief Justice of Queensland (1998–2014)
- Sir Alan Mansfield, KCMG, KCVO – former Chief Justice of Queensland (1956–1966), Governor of Queensland (1966–1972) and Chancellor of the University of Queensland (1966–1976)
- Walter Sofronoff QC – President of the Queensland Court of Appeal (2017–) and former Solicitor-General of Queensland (2005–2014)
- David Thomas – Judge of the Federal Court of Australia and President of the Administrative Appeals Tribunal (2017–2022)
- Hugh Fraser – Judge of the Queensland Court of Appeal (2008–)
- David North, SC – Judge of the Supreme Court of Queensland (2011–)
- John Helman – former Judge of the Supreme Court of Queensland (1994–2007)
- Tom Shepherdson – former Judge of the Supreme Court of Queensland (1982–2000)
- Kenneth Mackenzie (judge) – former Judge of the Supreme Court of Queensland (1989–2008)
- Peter Tesch – Australian Ambassador to Russia (2016–) and former Ambassador to Kazakhstan and Germany
- Peter Dunning QC – Solicitor-General of Queensland (2014–)
- Alex Freeleagus, AO, CBE, AM (Mil), RFD – Honorary Consul-General of Greece in Queensland (1957–2005) and noted Queensland solicitor
- Malcolm Hazell, CVO, AM – former Official Secretary to two Governors-General of Australia, Peter Hollingworth (2003) and Major-General Michael Jeffery (2003–2008)
- David Russell, AM, RFD, QC – Queensland barrister and prominent figure in the National Party of Australia
- Bill Glasson, AO – former president of the Australian Medical Association (2003–2005)

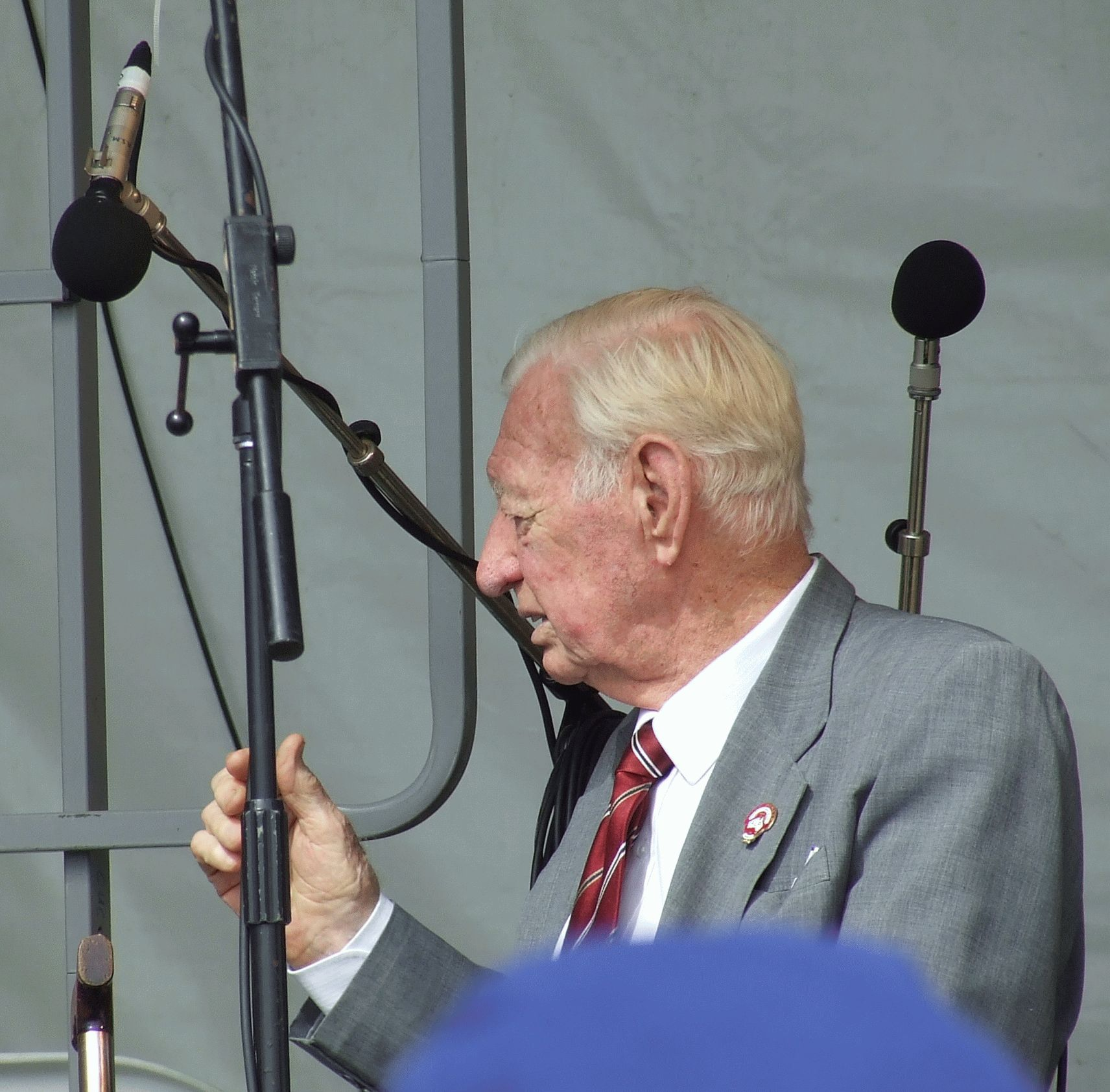
Clem Jones

=== Politics ===
- Tim Nicholls – former Treasurer of Queensland (2012–2015), former Leader of the Opposition (2016–2017) and current LNP Member for Clayfield (2006–)
- Cameron Dick – former Attorney-General of Queensland, Minister for Industrial Relations of Queensland and Minister for Education of Queensland (2009–2011); Minister of Health of Queensland and Minister of Ambulance Services of Queensland (2015–2017)
- Milton Dick MP - Speaker of the Australian House of Representatives (2022-)
- Andrew Laming former MP – Liberal Member for Bowman (2004–22) and Director of Funding for the Liberal Party of Australia
- Clem Jones, AO – Longest-serving Lord Mayor of Brisbane, Queensland (1961–1975)
- Sam Cox MP – former Queensland LNP member for Thuringowa (2012–2015)
- Dr. Christian Rowan MP – former President of the Queensland branch of the Australian Medical Association (2013–2014) and current LNP member for Moggill (2015–)
- Bruce Scott MP – National Party Member for Maranoa (1990–2016) and Deputy Speaker of the Australian House of Representatives (2011–2012)
- Ian Walker MP – LNP member for Mansfield (2012–2017) and former Minister for Science, Information Technology, Innovation and the Arts of Queensland (2013–2015)
- David Jull – Long-serving Liberal member for Bowman (1975–1983) and Fadden (1984–2007) in the Australian House of Representatives
- Jim Samios, AM, MBE – former Deputy Leader of the Liberal Party in the New South Wales Legislative Council (1995–2003)
- Neil Symes MP – former Queensland LNP Member for Lytton (2012–2015)
- Harold Lowes – former Queensland lawyer and Liberal Member for Brisbane in the Legislative Assembly of Queensland (1974–1977)
- Donald Cameron, AM – Queensland politician who represented Griffith (1966–1977), Fadden (1977–1983) and Moreton (1983–1990) in the Australian House of Representatives
- Graham Freudenberg, AM – Author and political speechwriter for leaders of the Australian Labor Party

=== Business and philanthropy ===
- Don Argus, AC – Former Chairman of BHP (1999–2010), National Australia Bank (1990–1999) and Brambles (1999–2008)
- Leigh Clifford, AO – former CEO of the Rio Tinto (2000–2007) and Chairman of Qantas (2007–2018)
- The Rev. Keith Rayner, AO – former Archbishop of Melbourne (1990–1999) and Anglican Primate of Australia
- Sir John Pidgeon – Queensland property developer
- Graham Fowles – Founder of Fowles, Australia's largest auction house
- Marcus Blackmore, AM – Chairman of Blackmore's Australia

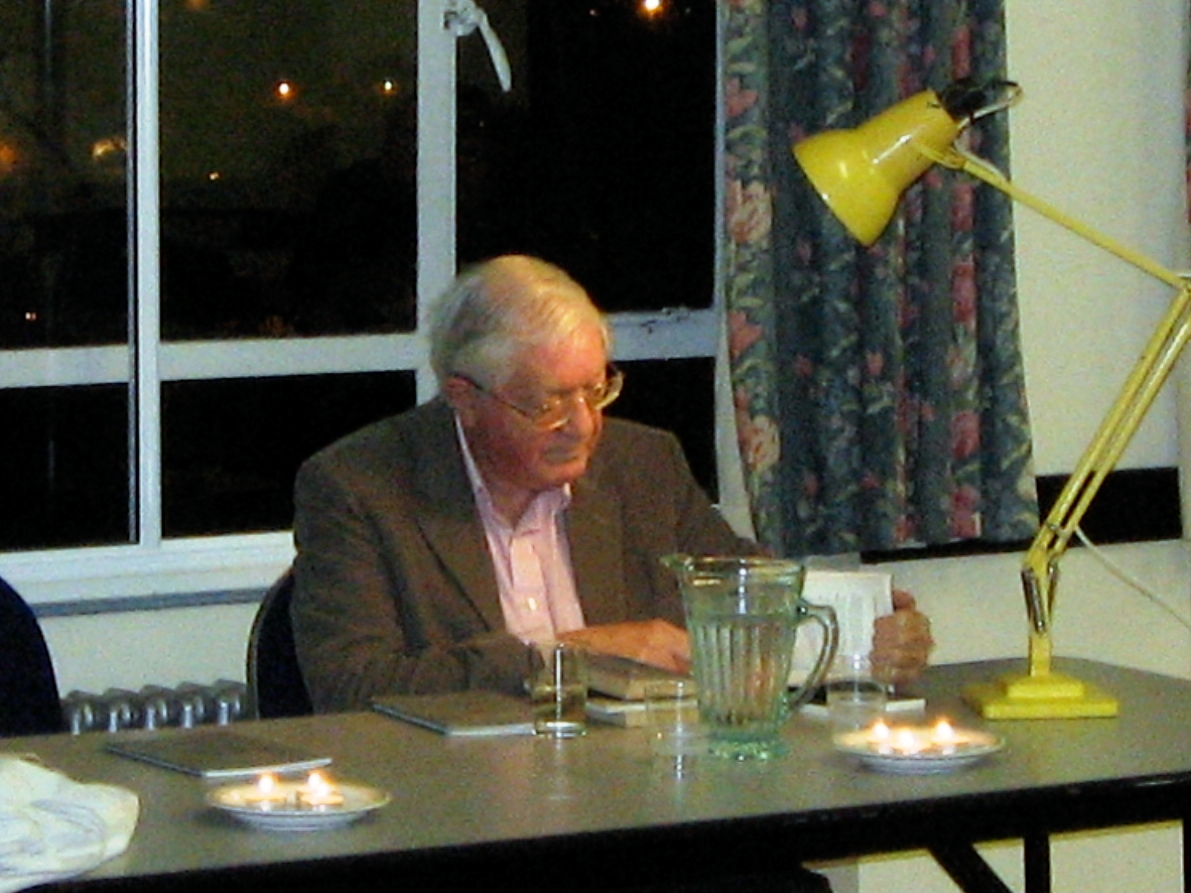
Peter Porter

=== Entertainment, media and the arts ===
- Peter Porter, OAM – Poet and 2004 candidate for Professor of Poetry at the University of Oxford
- Jeffrey Black – Opera singer
- Garth Welch – Ballet dancer and choreographer
- John Meehan – Artistic director and former ballet dancer
- Stephen Page – Indigenous dance choreographer and artistic director of the Bangarra Dance Theatre
- Simon Gallaher – Singer, actor, pianist, theatre director and theatrical producer
- Gyton Grantley – Actor
- John McCallum, AO, CBE – Actor and producer, highly successful in Britain
- Karl Stefanovic – Gold Logie winning television presenter and Australian media personality
- John Schluter – Presenter for Seven News
- James Swanwick – Anchor of SportsCenter on ESPN
- Donald Crombie – Film and television director
- Nick Earls – Award-winning Australian author
- Grant McLennan – Singer-songwriter and founding member of the alternative rock band The Go-Betweens
- Mike Chapman – Record producer and songwriter in Britain, prominent during the 1970s
- Philip Lindsay – Australian writer and historical novelist and the son of Norman Lindsay
- Dene Olding – Violinist, concertmaster and conductor
- Sam Cranstoun – Australian artist twice shortlisted for the Archibald Prize
- David Denholm – author

=== Academia and education ===
- Alistair Cameron Crombie – former historian of science at the University of Oxford and Fellow (subsequently Honorary Fellow) of Trinity College, Oxford
- Richard Leftwich – Fuji Bank and Heller Professor of Accounting and Finance at the University of Chicago Booth School of Business and a former Marvin Bower Fellow at the Harvard Business School
- Sam Hawgood – Chancellor of the University of California, San Francisco
- Franklin White – President, Canadian Public Health Assoc.(1986–88); Medal of Honor (1997) Pan-American Health Organization; endowed chair Dalhousie University (1982–89) and Aga Khan University (1998–2003)
- Mervyn Meggitt – Anthropologist who specialised in the study of Papua New Guinean and Aboriginal Australian cultures
- Cecil Pearce (former headmaster), OBE – former Headmaster of The Southport School (1950–1971)

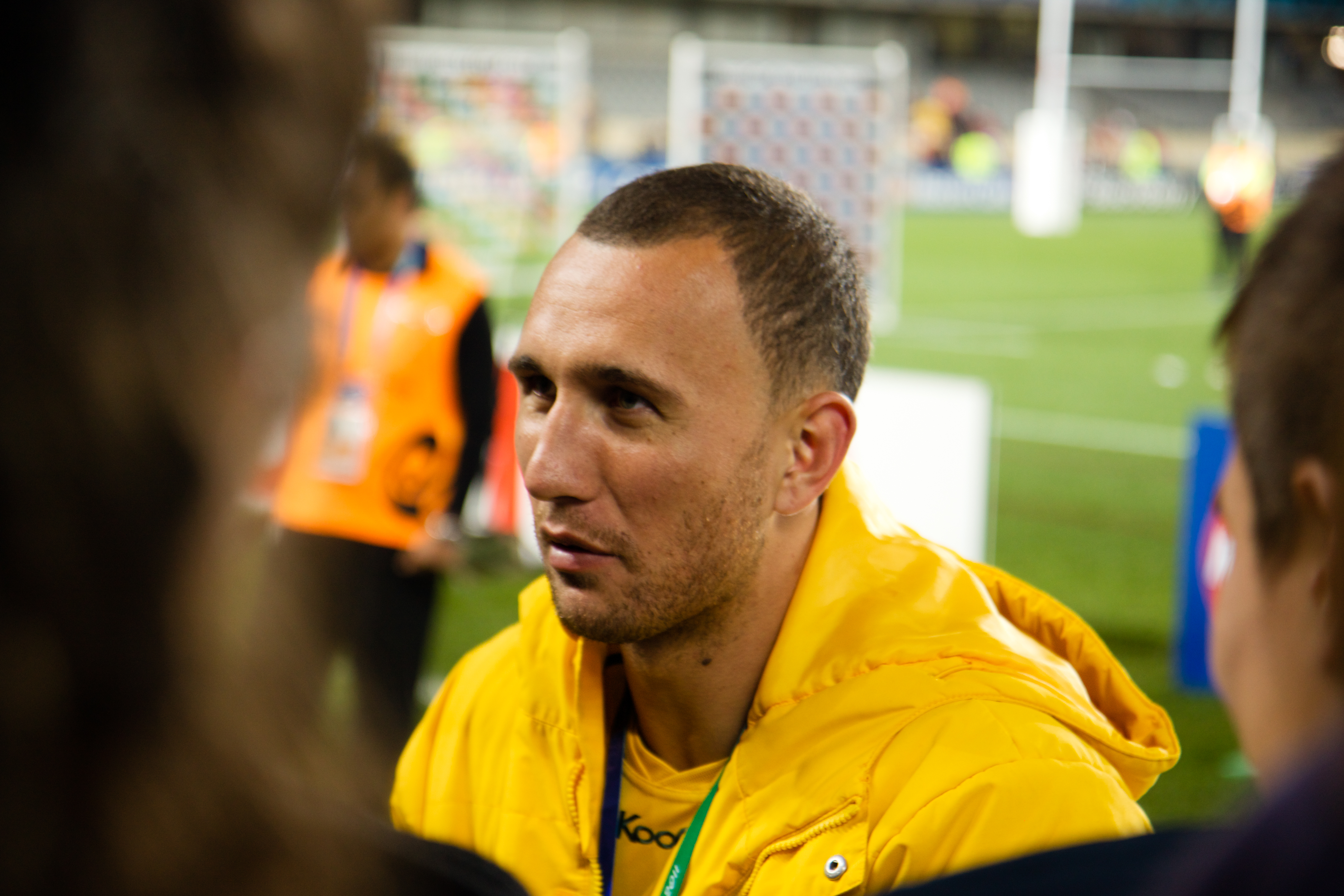
Quade Cooper

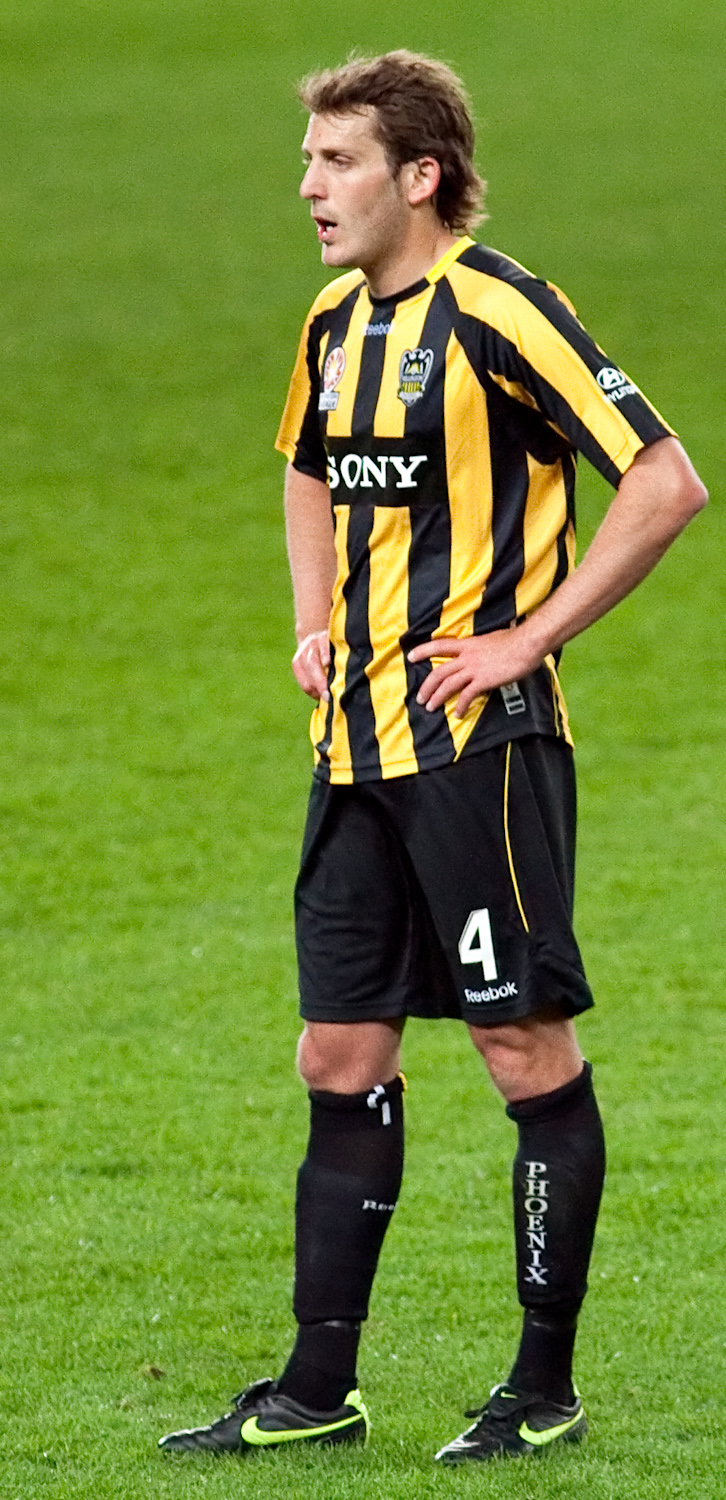
Jonathan McKain

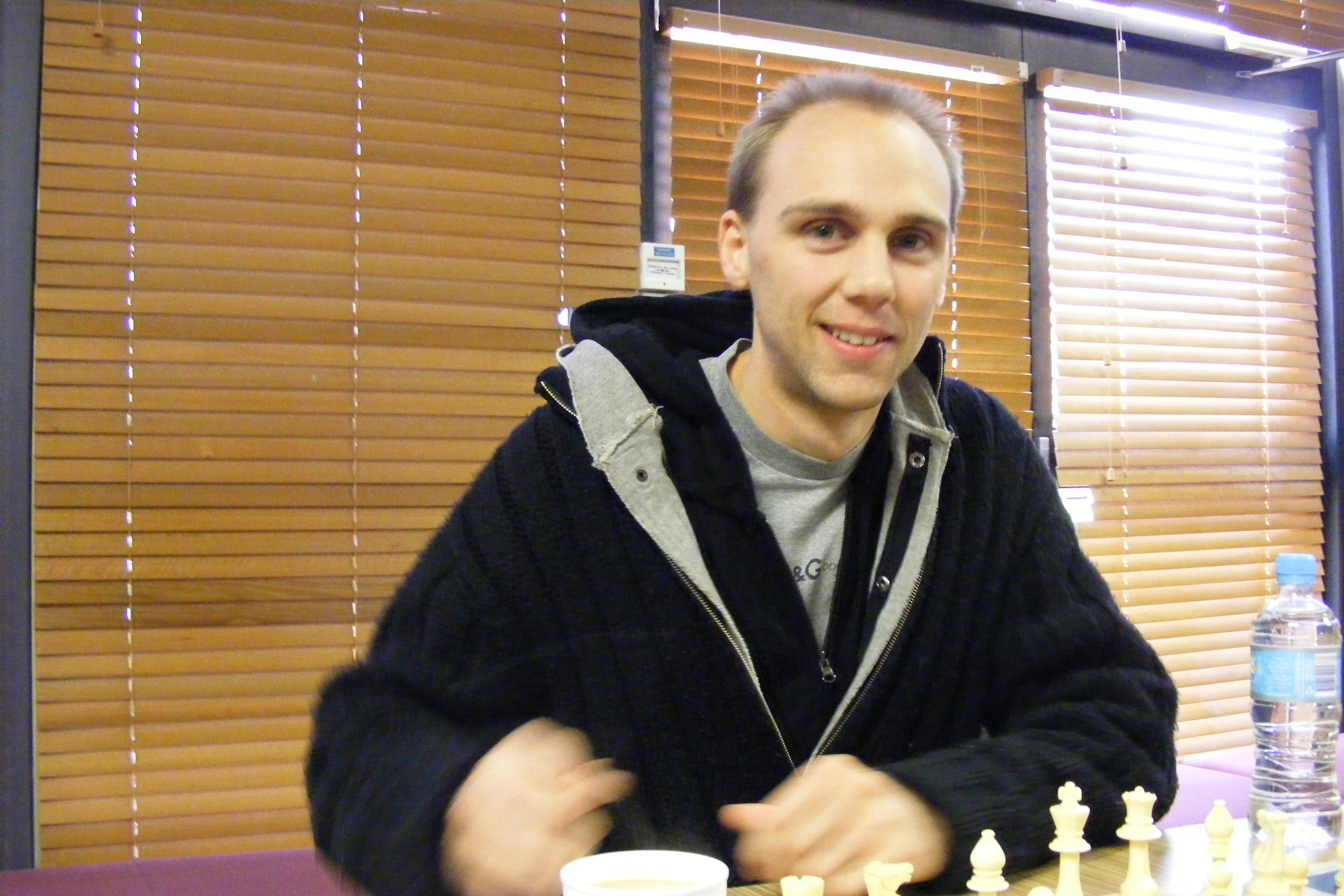
David Smerdon

=== Sport ===
- David Pocock – Player for the Brumbies and the Wallabies
- Quade Cooper – Player for the Queensland Reds and the Wallabies
- Karmichael Hunt – Player for the Queensland Reds; former player for the Brisbane Broncos and the Gold Coast Suns
- Jake Schatz – Player for the Queensland Reds
- Aidan Toua – Player for the Brumbies
- Michael Gunn – Player for the Queensland Reds
- Cameron Bairstow – Player for The Hawks
- Jarred Bairstow – Player for the Perth Wildcats
- Jaydn Su'A – Player for the South Sydney Rabbitohs
- Kalyn Ponga – Player for Newcastle Knights
- Brodie Croft – Player for the Melbourne Storm
- Mack Mason – Player for NSW Waratahs
- Isaia Perese – Player for Queensland Reds and Brisbane Broncos
- James Grant – Former Dalby Wheatmen Rugby Player
- Henry Taefu – Player for the Queensland Reds
- Tim Walsh – former player for the Queensland Reds
- Lloyd McDermott – Australia's second Indigenous Wallaby and first Indigenous barrister
- Robbie Russell – former player for the Scotland national rugby union team
- Junior Rasolea – Player for the Western Force
- Tom Hockings – Played for the Western Force
- Tom McQueen – Player for the Hong Kong Sevens team
- Keith Bell – former player for the Wallabies
- Walter Bennett – former player for the Wallabies
- Gavan Horsley – former player for the Wallabies
- Kerry Larkin – former player for the Wallabies
- David Rathie – former rugby union player for the Wallabies and cricketer for the Queensland Bulls
- Ric Trivett – former player for the Wallabies
- Jason Dunstall – former AFL player with Hawthorn
- Scott Harding – former AFL and American football player
- Jonathan McKain – former player for Adelaide United and the Socceroos
- Nathan Coe – Goalkeeper for Melbourne Victory and the Socceroos
- Steve Hogg – former player for the Socceroos
- Regan Harrison – former Australian breaststroke swimmer and silver medallist at the 2000 Summer Olympics
- Stephen Holland, OAM – Teenage freestyle swimmer who won medals at the 1974 Commonwealth Games and the 1976 Olympic Games, who broke twelve world records in a three-year career
- Peter Burge, AM – former Australian test cricketer and match referee
- Ron Archer, AM – former test cricketer
- Ken Archer, AM – former test cricketer and media executive
- Tony Dell – former test cricketer
- Dennis Lillie – former Queensland cricketer
- Ryan Broad – Professional cricketer for the Queensland Bulls
- Ben McDermott – Professional cricketer for the Queensland Bulls
- John Cuneo – Gold medal-winning sailor at the 1972 Summer Olympics and challenger in the 1974 America's Cup
- Peter Shakespear – Two-time Olympic rower and Olympic gold, silver and bronze medal-winning rowing coach
- Jared Bidwell – Australian rower
- Joshua Jefferis – Olympic artistic gymnast and medallist at the 2006 and 2010 Commonwealth Games
- Chilla Porter – Olympic-medal winning high jumper and medallist at the 1958 and 1962 Commonwealth Games
- Allen Crawley – Olympic long jumper
- John Millman – Professional tennis player
- Ian Ayre – former Australian tennis player
- James Giltrow – Australian light middleweight boxer
- David Smerdon – Australian chess grandmaster
- Clint Steindl – Australian basketball player with the Cairns Taipans
- Zac Stubblety-Cook – Gold medal-winning swimmer at the 2020 Summer Olympics
- Gregg Hansford – Professional motorcycle and automobile racer; ten-time Grand Prix winner
- Quinn MacNicol – Current Footballer for Melbourne City
- Mark McNee – Two-time Olympic speed skater
- Lucas Herrington - Football player for Premier League team Hull City A.F.C and current Socceroo

=== Military ===
- Major General Mike Hindmarsh, AO, DSC, CSC (Retired) – Former Australian Special Operations Commander (2004–2008) and current Commander of the Presidential Guard in the UAE Armed Forces
- Captain Bryce Duffy – Australian soldier killed on operations in Afghanistan in October 2011
- Galfry Gatacre CBE DSC DSO (1907–1983) – Royal Australian Navy rear admiral and first-class cricketer
- Christopher Johnstone – Royal Australian Air Force barrister and lawyer

=== Notable teachers ===
A number of notable individuals have taught at the school over the years. Some current and former teachers include:

- Richard Stone – former Olympic fencer and sports master at the school
- Michael Brimer – South African pianist, organist, conductor, composer and music master at Churchie in the 1950s
- Mel Johnson – Cricket umpire and former Australian test cricketer
- Dirk Wellham – former Australian One Day International and test cricketer
- Ian Greig – former England cricketer, player for the Cambridge University Rugby Union Football Club and brother of former England captain and commentator Tony Greig
- John Hipwell, OAM – former Wallabies scrum-half and Australian Rugby Union Hall of Fame Member
- Cheryl Kernot – former Leader the Australian Democrats and Queensland Senator (1990–1997).
- John Callie – former South African rower, representing them in the men's coxless pair event at the 1996 Summer Olympics.

== See also ==
- Great Public Schools Association of Queensland
- Lists of schools in Queensland
- List of boarding schools
