= E2C =

E2C may refer to:

- E-2C Hawkeye, a version of Northrop Grumman E-2 Hawkeye
- Estradiol cypionate, an estrogen medication
- Pennsylvania Railroad class E2c, an experimental locomotive
- Emulsion to combustion, a process for making emulsified fuel
- E2C, a Euphoria (programming language)-to-C translator execution mode
- Endure to Cure Foundation, a non-profit foundation
- Employability and Employment Centre, a programme by Autism Resource Centre (Singapore)
