= Alex Freeleagus =

Australian lawyer (1928–2005)

Alexander Christy Freeleagus AO CBE AM (Mil) RFD AE DUniv (28 December 1928 – 3 June 2005) was born in Brisbane, Queensland, Australia to Greek Orthodox parents. His father Christy Kosmas Freeleagus (Frilingos) was the Honorary Consul of Greece in Queensland, a role which Alex assumed upon his father's death in 1957. He was educated at the Anglican Church Grammar School, and the University of Queensland, graduating in law in 1953.

He served with the Royal Australian Air Force as a reserve officer and reached the rank of Wing Commander. He saw active service in Vietnam as a legal advisor.

In his role as Consul and later Consul-General for Greece, Freeleagus contributed greatly to the development and success of the Greek community in Queensland. He was one of the founders of Brisbane's Paniyiri (Greek Festival). In the address made by the Archbishop of the Greek Orthodox Church in Australia at Alex's funeral, he was described as exhibiting a meeting of "the two cultures" Greek and Australian.

Alex was also a senior Brisbane Lawyer, serving Henderson Lahey, then Henderson Trout, and later Clayton Utz as a senior partner. He was awarded an honorary doctorate of Griffith University in 1999 for his service to the Legal Community and was made an Officer of the Order of Australia (AO) in 1995 for his services to the Greek Community. He also received a CBE and the Gold Crosses of the Patriarchates of Jerusalem and Constantinople for his service to the community.

Alex died of a suspected heart attack on 3 June 2005 whilst snorkelling off Heron Island, Queensland. His funeral, held on 10 June 2005 at the Greek Orthodox Church of St George, Brisbane was attended by over 1,500 people, including many Australian politicians, diplomats and members of the legal community.
