= Kerry Larkin =

- Born: Kerry Kelsall Larkin; 22 June 1936 Brisbane, Queensland
- Died: 26 May 2021 (aged 84)
- School: Anglican Church Grammar School

Rugby union career
- Position: prop
International career
| Years | Team | Apps | (Points) |
| 1958 | Wallabies | 2 | (0) |

Kerry Kelsall Larkin (22 June 1936 – 26 May 2021) was a rugby union player who represented Australia.

Larkin, a prop, was born in Brisbane, Queensland and claimed a total of 2 international rugby caps for Australia. He was educated at the Anglican Church Grammar School.
