= William Perry French Morris =

Australian Anglican priest and headmaster

The Reverend William Perry French Morris OBE OM
- Canon
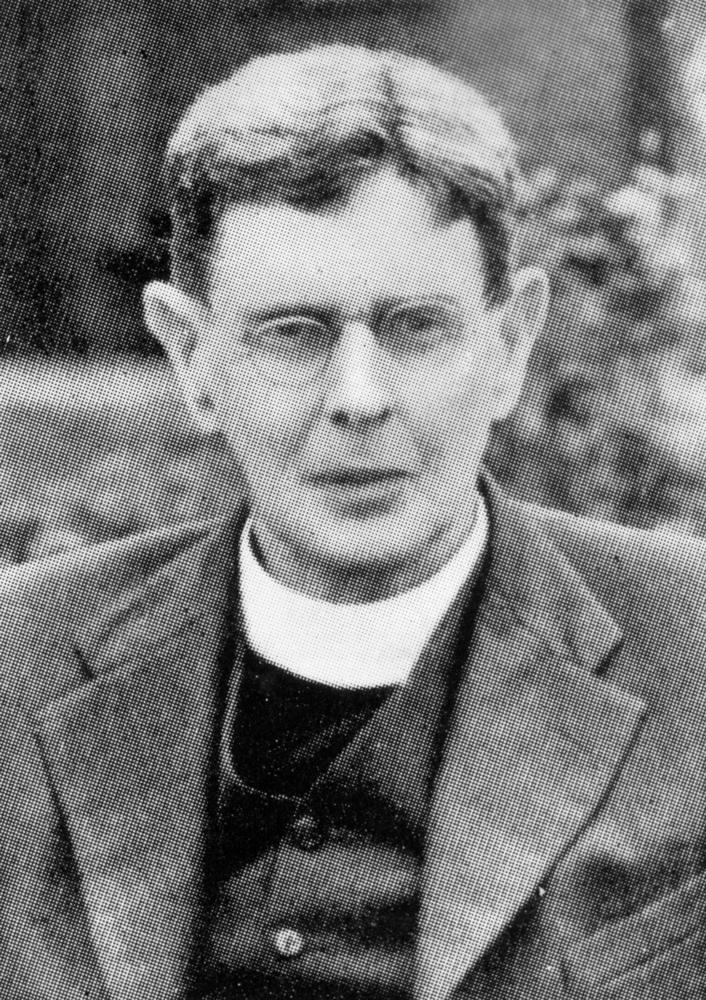
- Morris in 1912
- Church: Church of England

Orders
- Ordination: 7 June 1903 by Arthur Winnington-Ingram
- Rank: Priest

Personal details
- Born: 21 October 1878 Brighton, Victoria, Australia
- Died: 21 May 1960 (aged 81) Brisbane, Queensland, Australia
- Spouse: Ethel Ida Remfry

William Perry French Morris OBE OM (21 October 1878 – 21 May 1960), commonly known as Canon Morris, was an Australian Anglican priest and school headmaster. He founded Anglican Church Grammar School ("Churchie").

Morris grew up in an upper-class Melbourne family with strong ties to the Anglican church. A proponent of Muscular Christianity, Morris "eschewed emotional displays of Christian belief" in favour of a firm hand, which occasionally brought him into conflict with the Church. He spent years assisting needy communities in London, before returning to Australia. After repeated disputes with the Australian clergy, Morris began his teaching career. With his wife Ethel, Morris founded Churchie in 1912 and he served as headmaster for over 30 years. He was a strict disciplinarian nicknamed "the Boss" by students. Morris retired in 1946.

== Family background ==
William Perry French Morris was born in Brighton, Melbourne, on 21 October 1878. He was the eldest son and third child of William Edward Morris, a deputy-registrar of the Anglican Diocese of Melbourne, and his second wife Clara Elizabeth (née French). His father was born in the village of Leintwardine, Herefordshire, and migrated to Australia in 1853. His mother was born in British India, the daughter of an army officer. Morris had ten siblings, and he was known as Will or Bill to his family.

The Morris family has been noted as being particularly liberal for their time. In contrast to typical 19th-century women, Will's sisters Mary and Marcia respectively studied Arts and Science at university. Sisters Mary and Edith were the first principals of girls' school Merton Hall (now Melbourne Girls Grammar). Will's younger brother, Major General Basil Morris, was an Australian Army officer who served in both the First and Second World Wars.

William Perry French Morris was baptised on 21 November 1878, and is named after his godfather, Charles Perry, the first Anglican Bishop of Melbourne.

== Education ==
Morris entered the Melbourne Church of England Grammar School in 1886 as the first preparatory school student. Morris became a prefect. The school had been established in 1849 by his godfather Perry, though Morris and Perry never met.

In 1897, Morris won a Warden's Exhibition to Trinity College, University of Melbourne. He graduated with a Bachelor of Arts in 1900. He later completed an M.A. from Trinity College in 1915. During his time at Trinity, Morris regularly fined his study group for various rule breaches. After their exams, he spent the collected money on beer.

== Religious career ==
Beginning in July 1900, Morris pursued his studies at Ridley Hall, a theological college in Cambridge, England. He read theology and medieval history. His readings on the medieval period may have influenced him in choosing St Magnus, Earl of Orkney, as Churchie's patron saint.

Around this time he became influenced by the concept of "Muscular Christianity", a philosophical movement that originated from English public schools during the Victorian era. It centres on patriotism, masculinity, discipline and athleticism. In his first address to students' parents as Churchie headmaster, Morris would state his belief in training "characters as well as minds", encouraging students to participate in sport in addition to their studies. In 1937, he told parents to encourage their sons to "endure hardiness".

He prepared for his Orders from July 1900 to August 1901, and gained First Class Honours in the Preliminary Theological examination. Despite advice from his father to slow down his rapidly-developing religious career, Morris became a deacon of the Church of England on 22 December 1901. According to the writer Ronald Wood, Morris was ordained in St Paul's Cathedral by Bishop of London Mandell Creighton, though Creighton had died earlier that year.

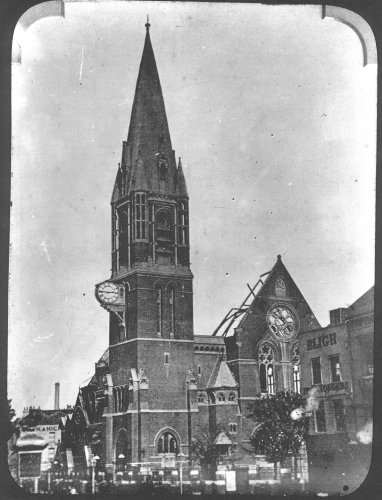
Morris worked at St. Mary's Church in Whitechapel.

A young idealist, Morris moved to London to work as Assistant-Curate at the Church of St Mary in Whitechapel, a historically impoverished area. This was based on his desire to "do social work on a religious basis, instead of doing religious work on a social basis". He wrote of his time in Whitechapel, "there I made so many friends amongst the most delightful, courageous people that it would be a shame to regret my decision, I made friends and I met a new kind of life."

By 1903, he was homesick and tiring of Whitechapel. His sisters Mary and Edith visited him in early 1903, and Morris made the decision to return to Australia. Morris was ordained as a priest in St Paul's Cathedral on 7 June 1903 by Bishop of London Arthur Winnington-Ingram. He returned to Melbourne soon after. On 13 September 1903 he was licensed as Assistant Curate at St James Old Cathedral. In March 1905 he was appointed vicar of the parish of St. Barnabas, South Melbourne. Around 1923, Morris began an association with the Bush Brotherhood.

== Clashes with the Church ==
Suspicious of dogma, Morris had a moral disregard for "institutional expressions of faith", which occasionally brought him into conflict with the Church. Archbishop Keith Rayner has described Morris as "a broad churchman whose religious understanding focused on the 'crises of humanity'".

Before his ordination as a deacon, Morris expressed his doubts to the bishop on the articles he was required to agree to. The bishop's response was reportedly "Oh, Morris, we all have those doubts." Morris later doubted if he should have been ordained.

In Whitechapel, Morris was visited by Bishop of Stepney Cosmo Gordon Lang (future Archbishop of Canterbury). Morris disapproved of Lang, referring to him as the "Darling of the Mayfair Drawing Rooms". When the Bishop arrived, Morris intentionally did not offer to carry his case for him.

During his time as vicar of St Barnabas, he came into conflict with Archbishop Lowther Clarke. Morris proposed special missions for wharf labourers and their families, who made up the majority of the parish. The Archbishop refused to authorise this due to the labourers' hard drinking and gambling.

== Teaching career ==
=== Early teaching career ===
Frustrated with the Anglican clergy, Morris left the St Barnabas parish in 1907 and found his vocation in teaching. He served an apprenticeship at Geelong Grammar School, and served as honorary chaplain from 1907–1908. He was assistant boarding master and chaplain at St Peter's College, Adelaide from 1909 to 1911. Morris advocated for smaller class sizes, where teachers could focus on individual pupils.

=== Founding of Churchie ===
Other than The Southport School, which was associated with the Church of England, Brisbane had no Anglican secondary school for boys. The Andrews family, friends of Morris and his wife Ethel Remfry, owned a large house in Toowong named Ardencraig. Morris and Ethel proposed the establishment of an Anglican private school at Ardencraig, in exchange for the tuition of the Andrews' three sons. On 8 February 1912, Morris and Ethel founded the school that was to become Churchie, then named St Magnus Hall.

At the time of the school's founding, no Anglican secondary school in Queensland had succeeded. Despite this, Morris declared he would operate the school as "public in spirit". By the end of 1912, St Magnus Hall had stunted with only 13 students. However, it received attention from prominent figures in Queensland's Anglican community, such as Archbishop of Brisbane St Clair Donaldson, allowing Morris to enhance the school. In early 1913, the school was moved next to St John's Cathedral and amalgamated with St John’s Day School. Its name was changed to St Magnus Hall Collegiate School For Boys, then to The Cathedral School.

Archbishop Donaldson developed an educational policy where the Anglican diocese would take over the administration of school's associated with the Church. It was always Morris's intention for the school to come under the Church's authority. The Church took control of The Southport School in 1913, then Morris’ school in 1914. Morris was retained as headmaster, and the school was renamed to Brisbane Church of England Grammar School for Boys. By the start of 1916, 100 students were enrolled at the school.

=== Oaklands Parade ===
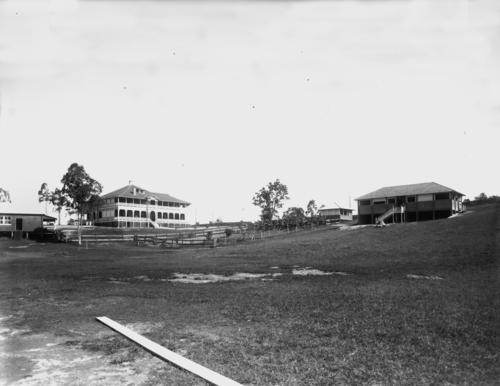
Churchie grounds and buildings, c. 1924

Due to increasing enrolment numbers, Morris decided to purchase land in East Brisbane and once again move the school. The foundation stone was laid in October 1917, establishing Churchie at its present site in Oaklands Parade, East Brisbane. On 10 June 1918, Governor of Queensland Sir Hamilton Goold-Adams officially opened the Church of England Grammar School.

Fellow headmaster Sir James Ralph Darling referred to Morris as first a priest and secondly a schoolmaster—though Morris's students disagreed. During Morris's tenure as headmaster, he rarely mentioned religion outside of church services, as he believed that Churchie's Christian values were so ingrained into the school that any further embellishments were unnecessary.

Morris had hoped that students would be referred to as "Magnates". He disliked the nickname "Churchie", however it had become commonplace by the 1930s and he accepted the change. His own nickname at Churchie was "the Boss". He had been given the name in March 1912 by Doug Logan, Churchie's fourth student.

Morris was an advocate of caning as part of school discipline, and this belief did not change through his career. In the 1930s, Morris caned a student six times on his first day at Churchie for loudly whistling. Morris also enforced his "Rules of the School", many of which were apparently made up on the spot.

As Churchie grew, Morris only taught classes on Latin. In reference to this, he would refer to students with the same name as Primus, Secundus, Tertius, etc. Morris was also a member of the Headmasters' Conference of the Independent Schools of Australia from its founding in 1931 to his retirement.

== Personal life ==
After his return from England, Morris met Ethel Ida Remfry, a friend of his sister Marcia. Morris and Ethel married at St John's Church, East Malvern, on 3 January 1905. Ethel was similarly a University of Melbourne graduate and taught at Merton Hall.

In late 1906, Morris and Ethel separated. According to historian John Cole, Morris's anti-socialism and intellectualism were incompatible with Ethel's feminism and modernist views. The couple had no children. They briefly reconciled for a few weeks in 1912, when Ethel assisted Morris in the founding of Churchie. She also taught at the school in its first year. In 1914, Ethel practiced as a general practitioner in rural Queensland before leaving to practice in England. Around 1919, Morris inquired about a divorce but the Archbishop would not permit it unless adultery was involved. Ethel eventually turned to painting and died in London in 1957.

== Achievements ==
Morris was appointed as an honorary Canon of St John's Cathedral on 1 September 1935 by Archbishop William Wand. Morris received an Order of the British Empire in June 1955.

== Later life and death ==
Morris's health began to worsen in the early 1940s. He developed arthritis and he was hospitalised in 1942. Three years later he fractured his right leg in a fall and had to use crutches for the rest of his life. He also developed a duodenal ulcer which would contribute to his death.

Morris retired at the end of 1946, having served as headmaster for over 30 years, and moved to Redcliffe. At the time of his retirement Churchie had 650 students. He would not accept his pension, claiming that the school could not afford it. Despite his concerns, Churchie had no debt at this time. Morris relented in 1954 and his pension was increased from £260 to £400 a year.

His memoir, Sons of Magnus: first steps of a Queensland school, was published in 1948. He also published Havenhome and Other Verses, a collection of poems. Morris died at St Martin's Hospital, Brisbane, on 21 May 1960. His funeral service was held at Churchie. He was cremated.
