= Keith Bell (rugby union) =

Australian rugby union player

- Born: Keith Radcliffe Bell; 10 June 1948 (age 78) Goondiwindi, Queensland
- School: Anglican Church Grammar School

Rugby union career
- Position: prop
International career
Years	Team	Apps	(Points)
1968	Wallabies	1	(0)

Keith Radcliffe Bell (born 14 June 1948) was an Australian rugby union player who played for the Australian national rugby union team, more commonly known as the Wallabies.

Bell, a prop, was born in Goondiwindi, Queensland and claimed one international rugby cap for Australia. He was educated at the Anglican Church Grammar School.
