= Dennis Lillie =

Australian cricketer (born 1945)

Personal information
- Full name: Dennis John Lillie
- Born: 28 October 1945 (age 81); Brisbane, Queensland, Australia
- Batting: Right-handed
- Bowling: Leg-break
- Role: Bowler

Domestic team information
- Years: Team
- 1965/66–1981/82: Queensland

Career statistics
Competition	First-class
Matches	17
Runs scored	135
Batting average	8.43
100s/50s	0/0
Top score	29
Balls bowled	2,674
Wickets	33
Bowling average	51.06
5 wickets in innings	1
10 wickets in match	0
Best bowling	5/48
Catches/stumpings	6/-
- Source: CricketArchive, 22 October 2011

Dennis John Lillie (born 28 October 1945) is a former Australian cricketer. A leg spin bowler, he played in the Queensland state team 17 times between 1966 and 1981. He was educated at the Anglican Church Grammar School in Brisbane.

Lillie's career partly overlapped with that of Australian fast bowler and ICC Cricket Hall of Fame inductee Dennis Lillee. The two similarly, but not exactly, named players never appeared together in the starting lineups of the same game, however Lillie was twelfth man in a Queensland v Western Australia Sheffield Shield game during the 1980–81 season, and in fact caught Lillee in the first innings of that game. The following line appears from that scorecard: DK Lillee c sub (DJ Lillie) b GS Chappell 11

In a South Australia v Queensland match in 1982, David Hookes hit four consecutive sixes, and 28 runs in an over, off Lillie's bowling.
