= David Scott (headmaster) =

Australian educationalist

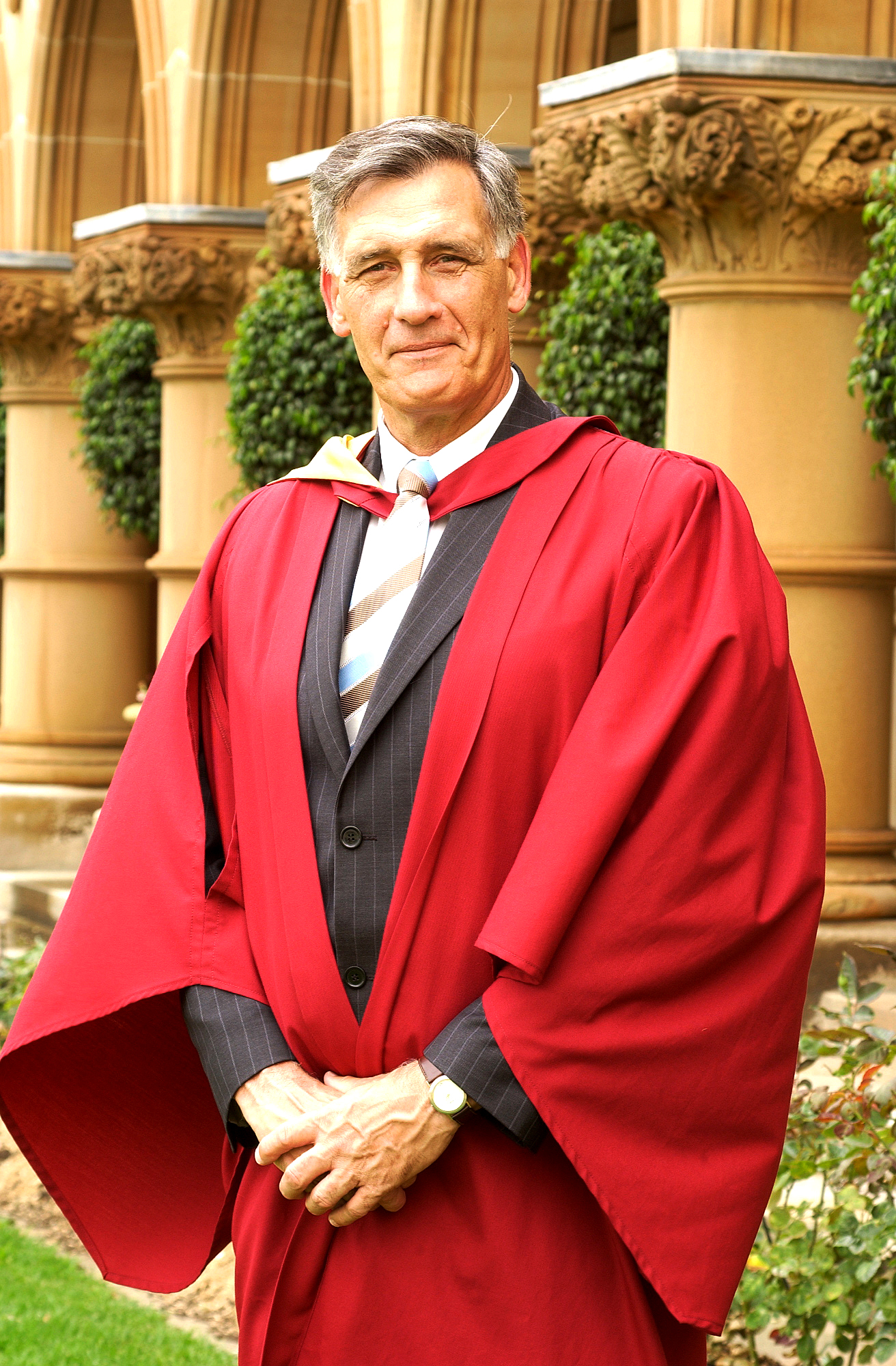
- Born: Western Australia
- Education: University of Western Australia; Murdoch University; Edith Cowan University
- Spouse: Linda
- Children: Two

David G. Scott is an Australian educationalist who has been the headmaster of Kingswood College in Melbourne, the Anglican Church Grammar School in Brisbane, and Newington College in Sydney.

== Teaching career ==
Scott taught for 21 years in government schools in Western Australia before being appointed as Deputy Headmaster of Wesley College, Perth. In 1994, he moved to Victoria to take up a position as the Headmaster of Kingswood College. He was the sixth Headmaster of the Anglican Church Grammar School ("Churchie"), in Brisbane. He has been a Western Australian state youth sailing coach and has competed in sailing at international, national and state competitions and has won Masters rowing events in national competitions.

== Anglican Church Grammar School ==
Scott was appointed in 1998 as the sixth Headmaster of Churchie. During a period of publicity over sex abuse allegations in Anglican schools and churches, Scott decided to contact 20,000 past and present students to ask about any abuse they may have experienced.

== Newington College ==
Scott was Headmaster of Newington College from mid-2003 to the end of 2008. During 2006, the press reported on a dispute where 40 department heads and housemasters were according to news reports forced to reapply for their positions. Scott said the action was part of a comprehensive review and had nothing to do with the Work Choices reforms, however Lee Rhiannon of the Australian Greens contested this, claiming that "it's certainly very similar to what WorkChoices allow employers to do."

On 20 March 2008 Scott announced his resignation as Headmaster of Newington College effective from 31 December 2008. He planned to retire to Western Australia. The headmastership at Newington College was taken over by David Mulford on 1 January 2009.

== Mowbray College ==
He was (October–December 2009) acting principal of Mowbray College, a large, Kindergarten to Year 12 IB World School with campuses at Melton and Caroline Springs in the western suburbs of Melbourne.

== Committees ==
Scott was an executive member of the Association of Independent Schools of Queensland and was the chairman of that body's education committee.

Educational offices
Preceded by Michael Smee	Headmaster of Newington College; 2003–2008	Succeeded by David Mulford
