= Ric Trivett =

- Born: Richard Murray Trivett; 2 October 1943 Brisbane, Queensland
- School: Anglican Church Grammar School

Rugby union career
- Position: centre
International career
Years	Team	Apps	(Points)
1966	Wallabies	2	(0)

Richard Murray "Ric" Trivett (born 2 October 1943) was a rugby union player who represented Australia.

Trivett, a centre, was born in Brisbane, Queensland and claimed a total of 2 international rugby caps for Australia. He was educated at the Anglican Church Grammar School.
