= Ben Greenfield =

American triathlete (born 1981)

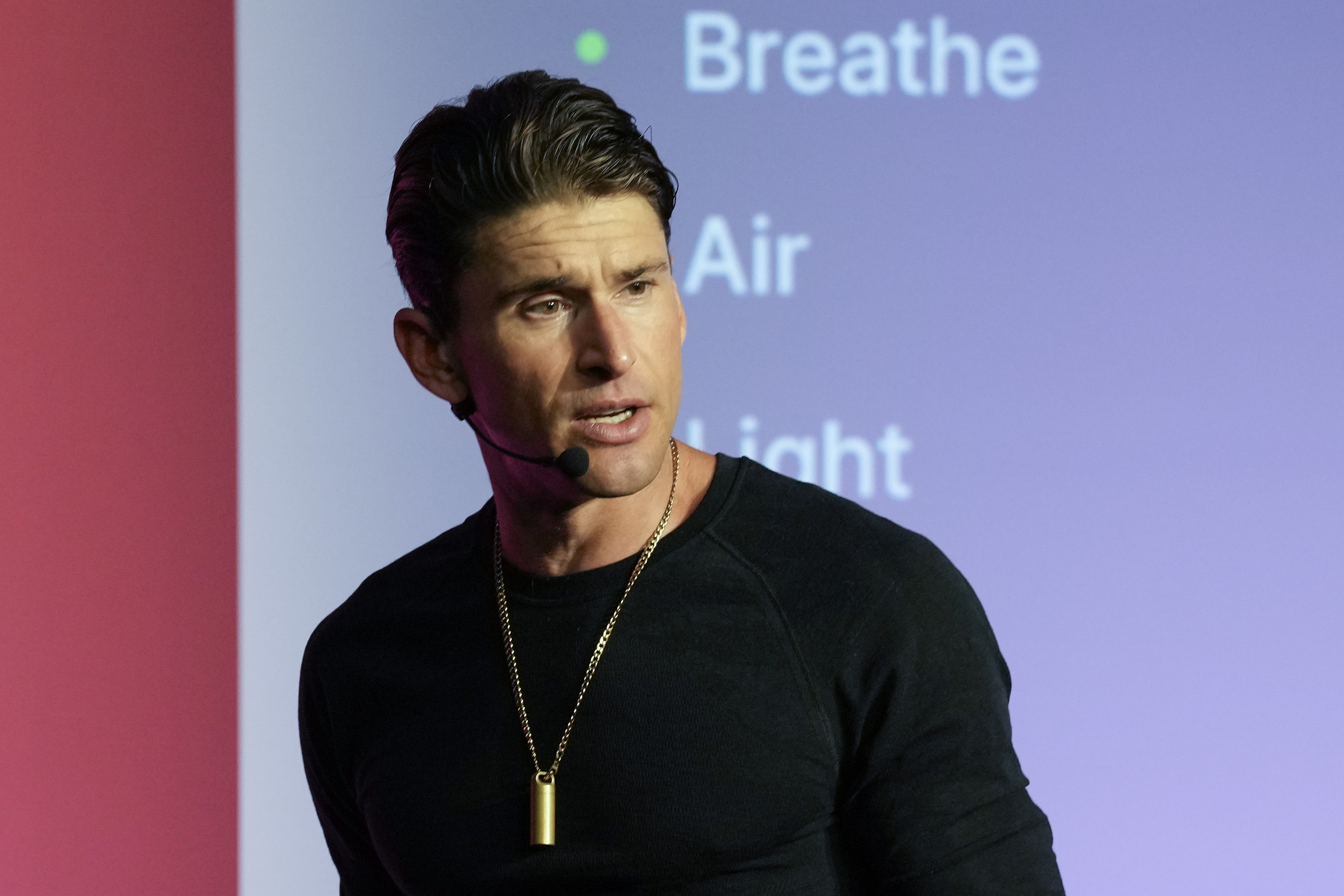
- Greenfield in 2023
- Born: December 20, 1981 (age 44); Lewiston, Idaho
- Education: University of Idaho
- Spouse: Jessa Greenfield (m. 2003)
- Children: 2
- Website: bengreenfieldlife.com

Ben Greenfield (born December 20, 1981) is a triathlete, personal trainer, nutritionist, author, public speaker, and former bodybuilder known for the practice of biohacking. He has participated in 13 Ironman competitions and over 120 races, becoming a USA Triathlon top-ranked athlete in his age group for a period of time.

== Early life and education ==
Greenfield was born in Lewiston, Idaho. He was homeschooled, finishing his high school academics at the age of 15. As a child, Greenfield played the violin, was the president of a chess club, and enjoyed reading and writing fantasy fiction. He first became interested in sports and fitness after his parents built a tennis court behind their home.

Greenfield attended Lewis–Clark State College, where he played collegiate tennis. He would go on to graduate from the University of Idaho, receiving a bachelor's degree and a master's degree in sports science and exercise physiology. He participated in an internship at Duke University with the Kansas City Chiefs of the National Football League.

== Career ==
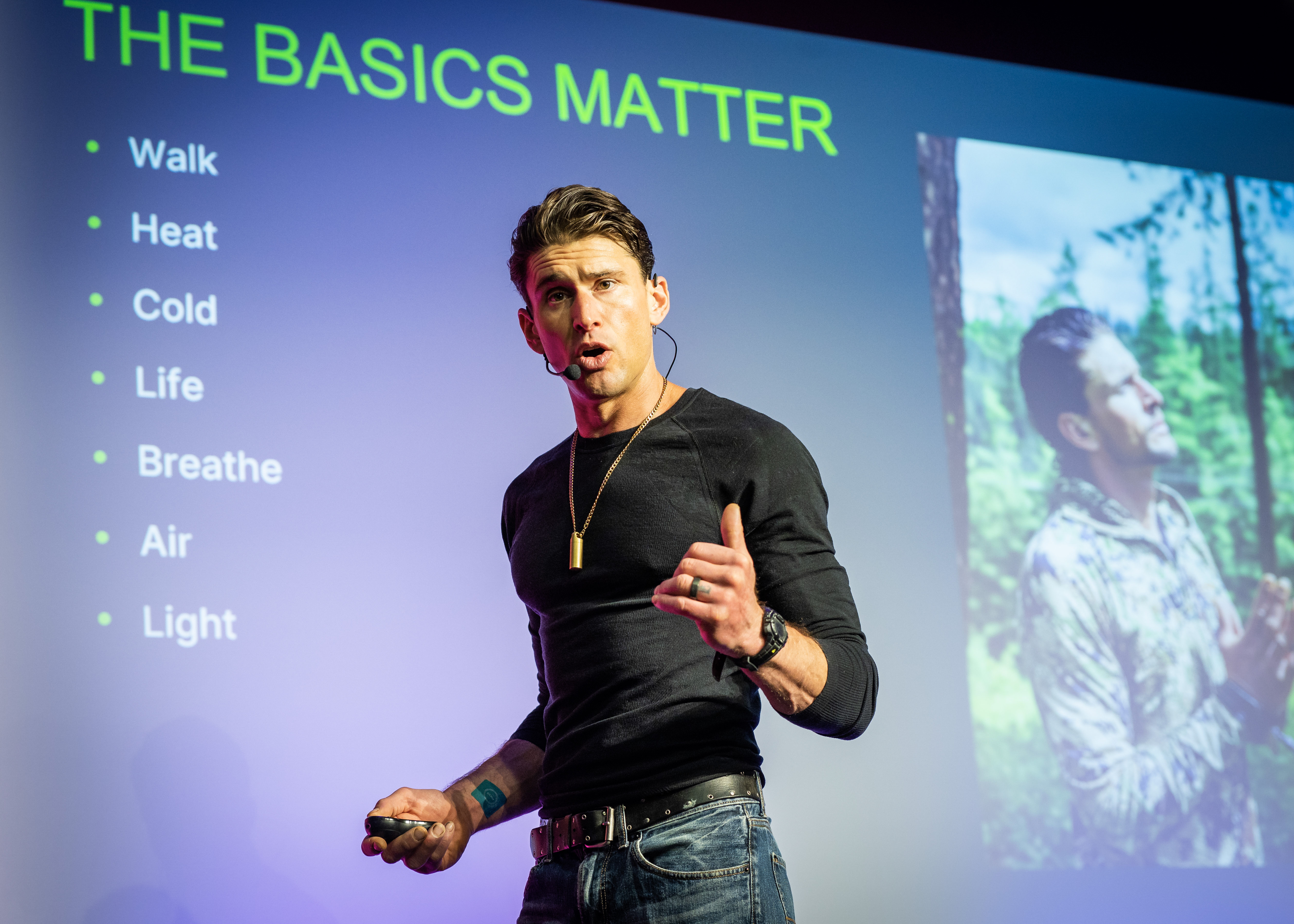
Greenfield speaking at the Health Optimization Summit in 2023

Greenfield is the founder of Ben Greenfield Life, a personal blog hosting articles and fitness tips, co-founder of Life Network, a health and wellness platform, and co-founder of KION (which began as Greenfield Fitness Systems), a supplement company. He holds certifications in Sports Nutrition from the International Society of Sports Nutrition, Advanced Bicycle Fitting from Serotta, Strength and Conditioning, and Personal Training from the National Strength and Conditioning Association (NSCA). In addition to these certifications, Greenfield has served as the head endurance coach for the Endure to Cure Foundation.

Greenfield began training for Spartan races in 2010, building several obstacles on the property where he lived at the time. He competed in a series of races leading up to, and including, the 2017 Reebok Spartan Race World Championship. Greenfield participated in 46 total Spartan races, which took place from 2014 to 2019.

He began heavily focusing on biohacking while taking part in the 2011 Hawaii Ironman Triathlon. In that same year. Greenfield released a downloadable fitness program designed to help athletes maximize their training for triathlons, called Triathlon Dominator. He would go on to win the International Triathlon Union Long Distance Triathlon World Championships for Men 30–34, and became a top-ranked triathlete in his age group.

In 2019, Greenfield presented a talk at TEDxCoeurdalene, titled "Bio Hacking or Ancient Ways of Living?". In that same year, he was a guest on The Joe Rogan Experience.

In June 2025, Greenfield was appointed as a strategic advisor to Gurner Group’s Saint Haven and SAINT private health clubs. As part of the partnership, he will develop anti-aging protocols for the group, evaluating nutrition, training, and other longevity modalities.

=== Media ===
Greenfield has appeared on the television shows Spartan: The Ultimate Team Challenge (NBC) and Steve Austin's Broken Skull Challenge. He has also created and hosts the Boundless Life Podcast (formerly the Ben Greenfield Life Podcast), which has featured guests like Twitter co-founder and chief executive officer, Jack Dorsey, among others. Greenfield's first podcast launched in 2007. He also previously hosted the Get-Fit Guy podcast.

== Bibliography ==
- 100 Ways to Boost Your Metabolism (2007) ISBN 9780979402708
- Personal Trainers' Guide to Earning Top Dollar: A Cutting-Edge Guide to Maximizing Your Income as a Personal Trainer (2009) ISBN 9781606790687
- Shape21: The Complete 21 Day Lean Body Manual (2012) ISBN 9781619841413
- Endurance Planet's Big Book of Bravado: Tales of Extreme Endurance (2012) ISBN 9781619841345
- Get-Fit Guy's Secrets to a Better Workout (2012) ISBN 9781466814226
- Weight Training for Triathlon: The Ultimate Guide (2014) ISBN 9781936910656
- Beyond Training: Mastering Endurance, Health & Life (2014) ISBN 9781628600476
- The Low-Carb Athlete: The Official Low-Carbohydrate Nutrition Guide for Endurance and Performance (2015) ISBN 9781517371531
- Christian Gratitude Journal: A Daily Guide for Enhancing Your Mind, Body and Spirit (2017) ISBN 9780692809518
- The Forest (2019) ISBN 9780999722701
- Boundless: Upgrade Your Brain, Optimize Your Body & Defy Aging (2020) ISBN 9781628603972
- Fit Soul: Tools, Tactics & Habits for Optimizing Spiritual Fitness (2020) ISBN 9780999722732
- Boundless Cookbook (2021) ISBN 9780578822006
- Endure: Tools, Tactics & Habits for Spiritual Stamina (2021) ISBN 9780999722763
- Spiritual Disciplines Journal (2021) ISBN 9780999722749
- Boundless Kitchen: Biohack Your Body & Boost Your Brain with Healthy Recipes You Actually Want to Eat (2023) ISBN 9781401977740
- Boundless Parenting: Tools, Tactics & Habits of Great Parents (2023) ISBN 9780999722770
- Boundless: Upgrade Your Brain, Optimize Your Body & Defy Aging, Updated and Revised (2025) ISBN 9781628605396

== Personal life ==
Greenfield married his wife, Jessa, in 2003. They have two children. He is a practicing Christian. As a hobby, Greenfield writes and produces music.

Greenfield participates in intermittent fasting and adheres to a Mediterranean diet. He has previously experimented with stem cell injections as a treatment for various ailments, including improving sexual health. He has also tried incorporating ice baths, infrared light therapy, and LSD-microdosing into his routines, performing numerous experiments on himself to advance his studies and practices in anti-aging. By the time Greenfield reached the chronological age of forty, his biological age was measured at nine.

In the past, Greenfield supported the claim that vaccines could potentially cause autism, later stating that he and his children are vaccinated, but "we need to respectfully pay attention to potential adverse health effects."

In 2023, Greenfield created a card game with his children, entitled Fart of War.

== Awards ==
In 2008, the NSCA recognized Greenfield as its Personal Trainer of the Year.

In February 2020, Greenfield's book, Boundless, appeared on the Publishers Weekly Adult Bestsellers list. Another book of Greenfield's, Beyond Training: Mastering Endurance, Health & Life, is a New York Times best seller.
