= Walter Bennett (rugby union) =

- Born: Walter Gordon Bennett; 26 March 1906 Brisbane, Queensland
- Died: 11 September 1979 (aged 73) Sydney
- School: Anglican Church Grammar School

Rugby union career
- Position: scrum-half
International career
Years	Team	Apps	(Points)
1931–33	Wallabies	4	(3)

Walter Gordon Bennett (26 March 1906 – 11 September 1979) was a rugby union player who represented Australia.

Bennett, a scrum-half, was born in Brisbane, Queensland and claimed a total of four international rugby caps for Australia. He was educated at the Anglican Church Grammar School.
