= Bill Hayward (educator) =

Australian educator and cricketer

Personal information
- Full name: William Irvine Dudley Hayward
- Born: 15 April 1930 (age 96); Glenelg, Adelaide, Australia
- Batting: Right-handed
- Bowling: Right-arm medium-fast

Domestic team information
- Years: Team
- 1950–1953: Cambridge University

Career statistics
Competition	First-class
Matches	27
Runs scored	309
Batting average	10.65
100s/50s	0/1
Top score	57
Balls bowled	4418
Wickets	68
Bowling average	28.64
5 wickets in innings	4
10 wickets in match	0
Best bowling	6/89
Catches/stumpings	23/–
- Source: Cricinfo, 6 October 2020

William Irvine Dudley Hayward OAM (born 15 April 1930) is a former Australian educator and first-class cricketer.

== Life and career ==
Bill Hayward was born in the Adelaide beachside suburb of Glenelg, and attended St Peter's College, Adelaide, where he captained the cricket team in 1948. In 1949 he went to study at Jesus College, Cambridge. He gained his cricket Blue for Cambridge University in 1950, 1951 and 1953 as an opening bowler. He took his best figures of 6 for 89 against Surrey in 1953. A week earlier he had taken eight wickets in the match against Nottinghamshire when the other Cambridge bowlers took only four.

After graduating, Hayward returned to Australia and became a school teacher. He was headmaster of the Anglican Church Grammar School in Brisbane from 1974 until his retirement in 1986. He was awarded the Medal of the Order of Australia in 1993 "for service to education particularly through the Queensland Association of Independent Schools".
