= Gavan Horsley =

- Born: Gavan Rex Horsley c. 1933 Coorparoo, Queensland
- School: Anglican Church Grammar School

Rugby union career
- Position: wing
International career
Years	Team	Apps	(Points)
1954	Wallabies	1	(0)

Gavan Rex Horsley (born c. 1933) was a rugby union player who represented Australia.

Horsley, a wing, was born in Coorparoo, Queensland and claimed 1 international rugby cap for Australia. He was educated at the Anglican Church Grammar School.
