= Richard Leftwich =

Richard H. Leftwich (born 1946) is Fuji Bank and Heller Professor of Accounting and Finance Emeritus at the University of Chicago.

== Awards ==
The Persian translation of his book The Price System and Resource Allocation won the Iranian Royal Book Award.
