= Endure to Cure Foundation =

Organization

Endure to Cure Pediatric Cancer Foundation
- Endure to Cure logo
- Founder: Jason Sissel
- Purpose: Pediatric Cancer
- Location: Wilmington, Delaware; Boston, Massachusetts; Chicago, Illinois
- Region served: United States
- Key people: Jason Sissel (Founder and President)
- Website: enduretocure.org

Endure to Cure Pediatric Cancer Foundation (E2C) is a non-profit foundation that raises funds to aid in the research and treatment of pediatric cancer, and to provide support for pediatric cancer patients. Endure to Cure Pediatric Cancer Foundation was founded by former Wall Street business professional, Jason Sissel.

The foundation's mission is to endure and conquer great physical challenges in order to advance cures for pediatric cancer, to “serve as an inspiration to people worldwide”, and to unite those who have been affected by cancer.

== History ==
Endure to Cure was inspired by a conversation between E2C's founder, Jason Sissel, and his grandfather several months before the latter died of cancer. Sissel later resigned from his career on Wall Street to start the foundation.

== Team Endure to Cure ==
Endure to Cure has a team of grassroots fundraisers known as "Team Endure to Cure," or more informally "Team E2C."

== Beneficiaries ==
Proceeds raised by Endure to Cure fund its three primary programs: Small Miracles which provides children who are undergoing cancer treatment with customized experiences or small gifts to help them get through treatment; Travel for Treatment Assistance which helps families in financial need with the uninsurable and immediate expenses associated with their child's cancer treatments; pediatric cancer research.
