= Hanworth, East Brisbane =

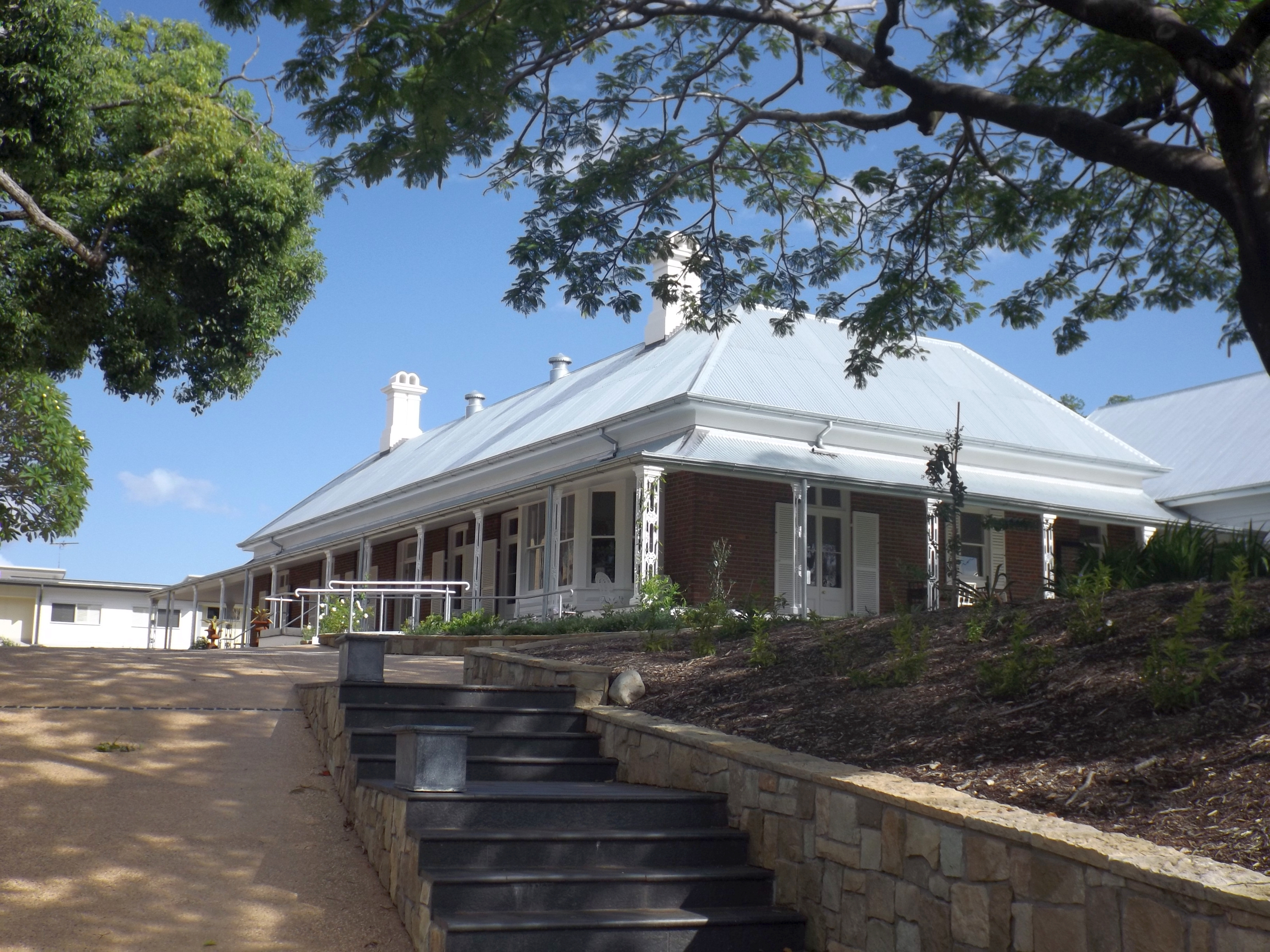
- Building in 2015

- Location within Queensland Location within Australia
- 27.4793°S 153.0476°E
- Location: 109 Lytton Road, East Brisbane, Queensland, Australia

History
- Design period: 1840s–1860s (mid-19th century)
- Built: 1864-65 – 1930s circa

Site notes
- Architect: James Cowlishaw

Queensland Heritage Register
- Official name: Hanworth Home for the Aged, Hanworth, The Hospice
- Type: state heritage (landscape, built)
- Designated: 21 December 1997
- Reference no.: 601026
- Significant period: 1860s, 1910s-1930s (fabric); 1860s-1890; 1910s (historical)
- Significant components: trees/plantings, garden/grounds, residential accommodation – main house, lawn/s, fence/wall – perimeter, attic, furniture/fittings, driveway, dormitory wing

Hanworth is a heritage-listed villa at 109 Lytton Road, East Brisbane, Queensland, Australia. It was designed by James Cowlishaw built from 1864 to 1930s circa. It is also known as Hanworth Home for the Aged and The Hospice. It was added to the Queensland Heritage Register on 21 December 1997.

== History ==
Hanworth, a substantial, brick, single-storeyed residence near Norman Creek at East Brisbane, was erected in 1864–65 for Lieutenant George Poynter Heath, RN, Portmaster of Queensland and member of the Marine Board, and his family. It was designed by early Brisbane architect James Cowlishaw.

Hanworth originally stood on just over 7 acres (2.8 ha), first alienated by a Sydney land speculator in 1851. The land fronted the main road to Lytton, had a substantial frontage to Norman Creek, and from the highest point near the Lytton Road, possessed excellent views of the Humbug Reach of the Brisbane River, overlooking New Farm. In July 1863 Heath purchased this land for £241/8/-. It was close to a number of fine residences already established along Humbug Reach, including Eskgrove (occupied by the Heaths from at least May 1861), Riversdale (Mowbray Park – Mowbray Park War Memorial) and Shafston House upstream, and Bulimba House further downstream.

GP Heath (1830–1921) was born at Hanworth in Norfolk, England, second son of Rev. Charles Heath and Mary Annole Poynter. Educated at Cheltenham College, he joined the navy as a cadet in 1845. In 1846–53 he served in HMS Rattlesnake (under Owen Stanley till 1850) and in the Fantome and the Calliope on the Australian station. On his return to England he worked at the Admiralty drawing charts of areas surveyed by the Rattlesnake. Late in 1859 he applied for the government post of marine surveyor in the new colony of Queensland and was appointed. On 23 February 1860, before sailing for Queensland, he married Elizabeth Jane Innes. They arrived in Brisbane in late August 1860, and Heath immediately took up his appointment with the Department of the Surveyor-General.

The early 1860s were formative years for the new colony. One of the first actions of the colonial government was to establish a Select Committee on Government Departments (1860), which recommended that a Portmaster be appointed to take overall charge of the Harbour Master's Department, and the appointment of GP Heath as Portmaster of Queensland, a position he held for nearly 30 years, was made in January 1862. During his long tenure, Heath was responsible for supervising the opening of 13 new ports (including Townsville and Cairns), establishing 33 lighthouses, 6 lightships and 150 small lights, and marking 450 miles (720 km) of the inner route through the Barrier Reef. In 1862, the colonial government also established the Marine Board of Queensland, comprising the Portmaster of the colony and four other members. From 1869, when he retired from the Royal Navy as a Commander, until his Queensland retirement in 1890, GP Heath was Chairman of the Marine Board. He was also active in Anglican work, serving as chairman of various committees in Synod from 1876 to 1889. For many years he held a commission of the peace. He is memorialised in East Brisbane in Heath and Hanworth Streets and Heath Park.

Work on the construction of Hanworth had been commenced by 16 July 1864. The Heaths were prominent members of Brisbane society, and the architect they chose to design their new home was equally well-known and successful. James Cowlishaw practised architecture in Brisbane from 1860 until c. 1890, when he retired to devote his attention to his many other business interests, including ownership of The Telegraph newspaper. In the early 1860s he established himself as Brisbane's first successful architect in private practice, and at the time Hanworth was under construction, Cowlishaw had a dozen other major projects underway, including Oakwal, the fine stone residence commissioned by Queensland's then Chief Justice, Sir James Cockle. The Heaths were still resident at Eskgrove in November 1864 when their third child was born, but had left by August 1865 and certainly had occupied Hanworth by the time twin sons were born in July 1866. It is likely they moved into Hanworth in the first half of 1865.

Hanworth was the Heath family's home for nearly 25 years. They moved amongst Brisbane's highest society, and entertained frequently; at the reception held at Hanworth on the marriage of their daughter Cecelia Georgina in 1886, guests included the Governor and Lady Musgrave, the Premier and Mrs Samuel Griffith, Treasurer James Dickson, Mr Justice and Mrs Harding, several high-ranking government officials and officers of visiting ships. On 30 June 1890, Commander Heath retired from the position of Portmaster of Queensland. Although the family returned to England soon afterwards, Hanworth remained in Heath's (and later his daughters') possession, and by 1891 was leased by Brisbane bank manager, (later stock and share broker), Alexander Henry Hudson and his family. The Hudsons resided at Hanworth for about 22 years, and were still in occupation when the property was advertised for sale in October 1909. At this time the house was described as a Substantial Brick Structure, containing 8 rooms and all offices, with 7 acres (2.8 ha) of land, having long frontage to the main Lytton road and Norman Creek. (Brisbane Courier 2/10/1909:9:1) The property did not sell, however, and in early 1912, after the Hudsons had moved to Kangaroo Point, was put up for auction as the Hanworth Estate, subdivided into 57 residential allotments. A number of the vacant allotments sold at this time, but the house remained unoccupied until acquired by Mrs Mary Marguerite Wienholt, who obtained title in July 1913. The grounds had been reduced to just over 3 roods (33,000 sq ft; 3,000 m^{2}), and did not include the former tennis court.

Mrs Wienholt was a member of the Brisbane branch of the Theosophical Society, established in New York in 1875 with the aims of universal brotherhood and the study of comparative religion, philosophy and science. At Hanworth in 1913, Mrs Wienholt established, in memory of her mother, a home for elderly, impoverished gentlewomen, and renamed the place The Hospice. Mrs Wienholt took a strong personal interest in the running of the home until handing over the place in mid-1927 to the Brisbane Theosophical Society.

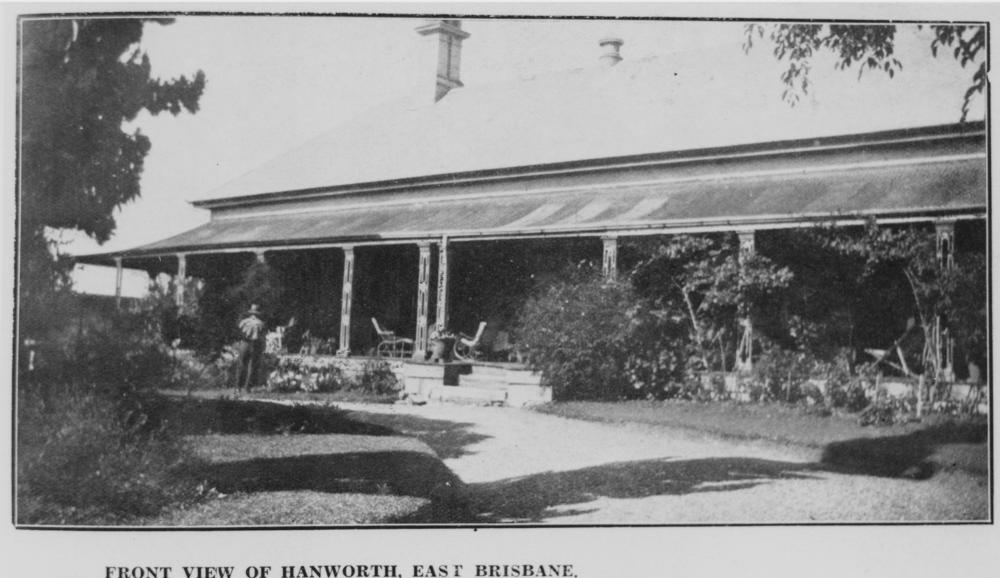
Front view of Hanworth, 1930

A description of the house in 1930 suggested that the conversion to a hospice and nursing home in the early 20th century did not substantially alter the 1860s core. Most of the rooms in the long brick front wing remained intact, although one of the large bedrooms had been partitioned into two. A hallway ran from the front entrance (facing north/northeast) to the rear verandah. To the left were the bedrooms (some with marble mantelpieces); to the right was the drawing room, and beyond that a large bow-windowed dining room, with doors opening onto side and rear verandahs. The drawing and dining rooms had back-to-back fireplaces, with marble mantelpieces. Side wings ran back from each end of the front section, creating a small U-shaped courtyard in which a grove of mandarine trees had been established. The east wing contained an attic room with gabled windows, which was accessed via a small lobby and staircase at the southern end of the wing. The grounds contained a number of mature pine trees of different varieties, and roses and creeping plants climbed the ornamental iron verandah posts.

The principal alterations appear to have been the construction, by 1918, of a timber wing off the west wing at the rear of the house – probably associated with the hospice conversion and possibly occupying the site of a former kitchen wing – and an inter-war two-storeyed brick addition at the south end of the east wing.

The Theosophical Society continued to operate the home according to Mrs Wienholt's wishes, for nearly 70 years. It was sold in 1995 to the Anglican Church, which renamed it the Hanworth Home for the Aged and continued to accommodate only women.

Marisa and Philip Vecchio purchased Hanworth in 2012 in memory of Marisa's mother Romana Preston who died from ovarian cancer. They commenced extensive renovations in preparation for the house's 150th anniversary, but a fire extensively damaged the property in March 2013. However, the Vecchio family persisted with the restoration and completed it in time for the anniversary. Their efforts were recognised by receiving the John Herbert Memorial Award (the highest award) from the National Trust of Australia in August 2014.

== Description ==
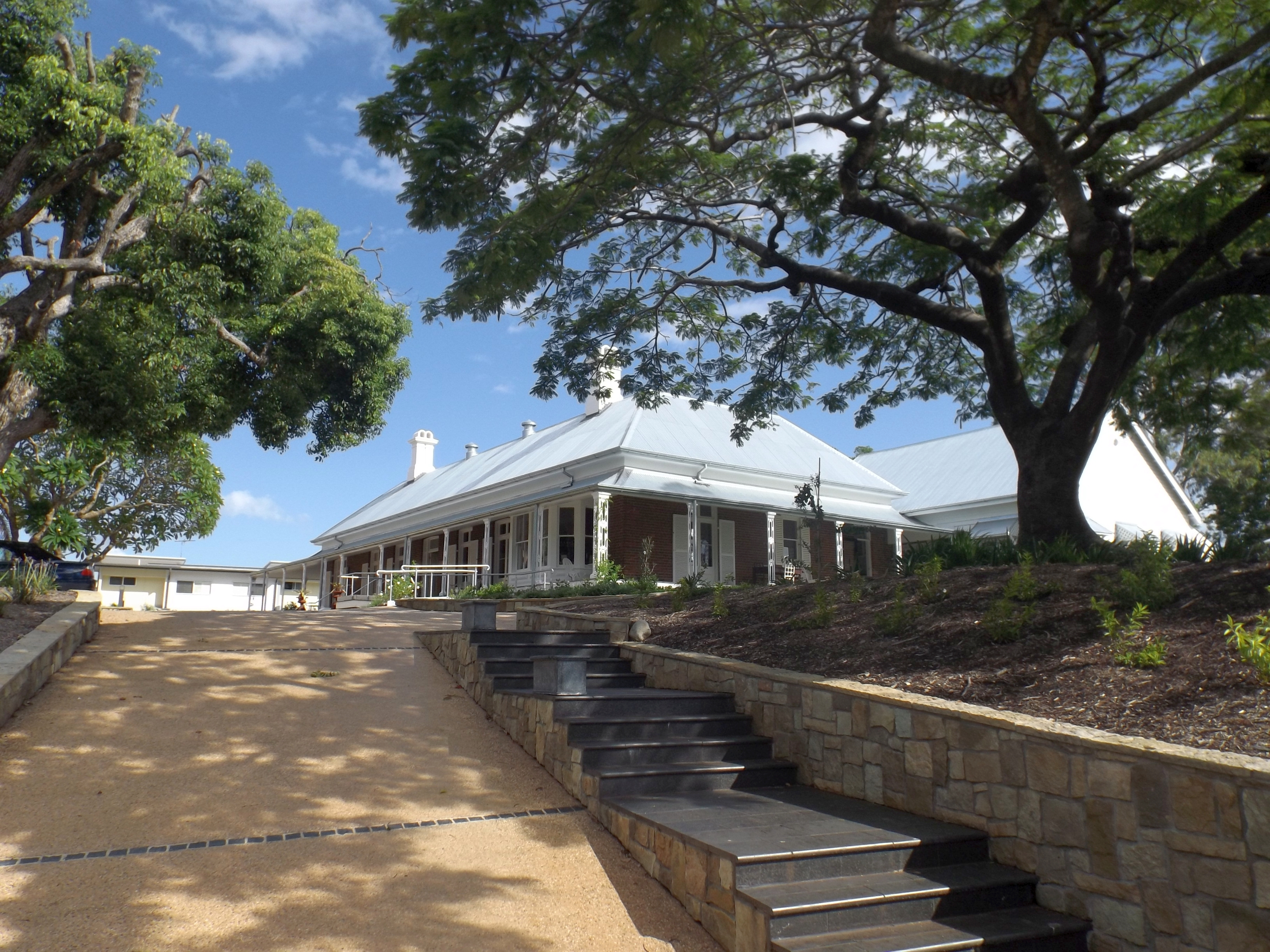
Driveway and building in 2015

Hanworth is a single-storeyed 1860s masonry residence with timber and masonry extensions, standing on a rise above Lytton Road. A drive leads from the Lytton Road to the main entrance, which faces north. There is a garden between Lytton Road and the building, which includes a lawn area and a number of pine trees.

The original section of Hanworth is a single-storeyed, U-shaped, unpainted redbrick building, with characteristics demonstrating a Georgian influence. The principal elevation faces north with a broad verandah running around the northern, eastern and western perimeter of the building. The original building is only one room in depth. The hipped roof and separate verandah roof are sheeted with corrugated iron. At each end of the roof is a moulded brick chimney. It is substantially intact with most of its original glazing, joinery and hardware.

The verandah has a timber floor and elegant cast-iron grille columns supporting the concave roof. The underside of the verandah roof is lined with tongue and groove boards. A timber hand rail and modern wrought iron balustrade run between the columns. The main doorway is in the centre of the northern facade with three sets of French doors to the east and two sets of French doors and a bay window to the west. All the French doors have external shutters.

From the northern verandah the large two-panelled front door leads to the entry hall which runs through to a rear door. The open verandah that ran around the internal section of the U has been enclosed. The drawing room opens from the right of the entry hall. It has a fine white marble fireplace surround and an internal door that leads to the dining room. The dining room has a large bay window and a black marble fireplace surround. The drawing and dining rooms contain pieces of furniture, sideboards, chairs and tables which probably date from the period of the conversion of Hanworth into a home for gentlewomen.

The dining room forms the north-west corner of the building. Behind it is the western wing containing the kitchen and a timber bedroom section. The kitchen is in the 1860s building, although this is probably not the original kitchen as there is no evidence of a chimney. The gabled timber section of the wing probably dates from the conversion to institutional use and contains 7 bedrooms and 2 bathrooms. Internally the walls are tongue and groove and the casement windows have diamond patterned glazing bars. A besser block laundry is at the end of this wing.

To the left of the entry hall three bedrooms open onto the northern verandah; two of the bedrooms have been created by subdividing one of the original bedrooms. The eastern wing contains three bedrooms and an office. A staircase leads to an attic above the 1860s building. The attic addition has three dormer windows and although not part of the original design probably dates from the Heaths' occupation of the house. At the rear of the eastern wing is a two-storeyed, inter-war masonry addition which contains bedrooms and bathrooms.

== Heritage listing ==
Hanworth Home for the Aged was listed on the Queensland Heritage Register on 21 December 1997 having satisfied the following criteria.

The place is important in demonstrating the evolution or pattern of Queensland's history.

Hanworth, erected in 1864–65, is important in illustrating the early development of East Brisbane, and remains one of the suburb's earliest surviving houses. Like nearby Eskgrove, Mowbray Park, and Shafston House, Hanworth, with its former frontage to Norman Creek and views of the Brisbane River, remains important surviving evidence of the fine riverine estates which lined the Humbug Reach of the Brisbane River in the mid-19th century.

The place demonstrates rare, uncommon or endangered aspects of Queensland's cultural heritage.

Hanworth, erected in 1864–65, is important in illustrating the early development of East Brisbane, and remains one of the suburb's earliest surviving houses.

The place has potential to yield information that will contribute to an understanding of Queensland's history.

It also has potential to reveal further information about 1860s building techniques in Brisbane, and about the work of early Brisbane architect James Cowlishaw.

The place is important in demonstrating the principal characteristics of a particular class of cultural places.

The grounds have been reduced considerably, but the house survives as one of the most intact 1860s residences in Brisbane, and is an excellent example of its type. The simple U-shaped building with its hipped roof, concave verandah, cast-iron columns and red brick, retains the elegant symmetry and proportion of a Georgian-influence design. Internally the planning and proportions of the rooms are still evident and a substantial amount of original fabric remains, particularly joinery, which includes doors, windows, shutters, architraves and skirtings.

The place is important because of its aesthetic significance.

The earliest section of Hanworth is important in exhibiting a number of aesthetic and architectural features. Its picturesque siting on a rise allowed for views up and down the Brisbane River and along Norman Creek.

The place has a special association with the life or work of a particular person, group or organisation of importance in Queensland's history.

The place is important for its long and close association with George Poynter Heath, the first Portmaster of Queensland, who, during his long tenure of office (1862 to 1890), oversaw the establishment of many of Queensland's principal ports, and made the Queensland coast safer for navigation with the erection of an extensive network of lighthouses, lightships, small lights and markers. The place is significant also for its long association with the work of Mary Marguerite Wienholt and the Brisbane Theosophical Society in aged care for women.
