= Hanworth (disambiguation) =

Hanworth is a suburb of London, England.

Hanworth can also refer to:

- Hanworth, Bracknell, Berkshire, England
- Hanworth, East Brisbane, Queensland, Australia
- Hanworth, Norfolk, England
- Cold Hanworth, Lincolnshire, England
- Potterhanworth, Lincolnshire, England
- Viscount Hanworth, a title in the Peerage of the United Kingdom
