= William Wilson (Queensland politician) =

Australian politician (1832–1903)

The Hon William Wilson

Member of the Queensland Legislative Council
- In office 2 January 1874 – 6 June 1878

Personal details
- Born: William Wilson; 1832 Fermanagh, Ireland
- Died: 1903 (aged 70–71) Brisbane, Queensland, Australia
- Resting place: Toowong Cemetery
- Spouse: Eliza Coutts (m.1858 d.1909)
- Occupation: Businessman

William Wilson (1832—1903) was a politician in Queensland, Australia. He was a Member of the Queensland Legislative Council.

== Politics ==
William Wilson was appointed to the Queensland Legislative Council on 2 January 1874. Although a lifetime appointment, his seat was declared vacant on 6 June 1878.

== Personal life ==
William Wilson had (the now heritage-listed) Wilston House built for him in c. 1876 in Newmarket, Brisbane. He died in Brisbane in 1903 and was buried in Toowong Cemetery.

== See also ==
- Members of the Queensland Legislative Council, 1870–1879
