= Wilston House =

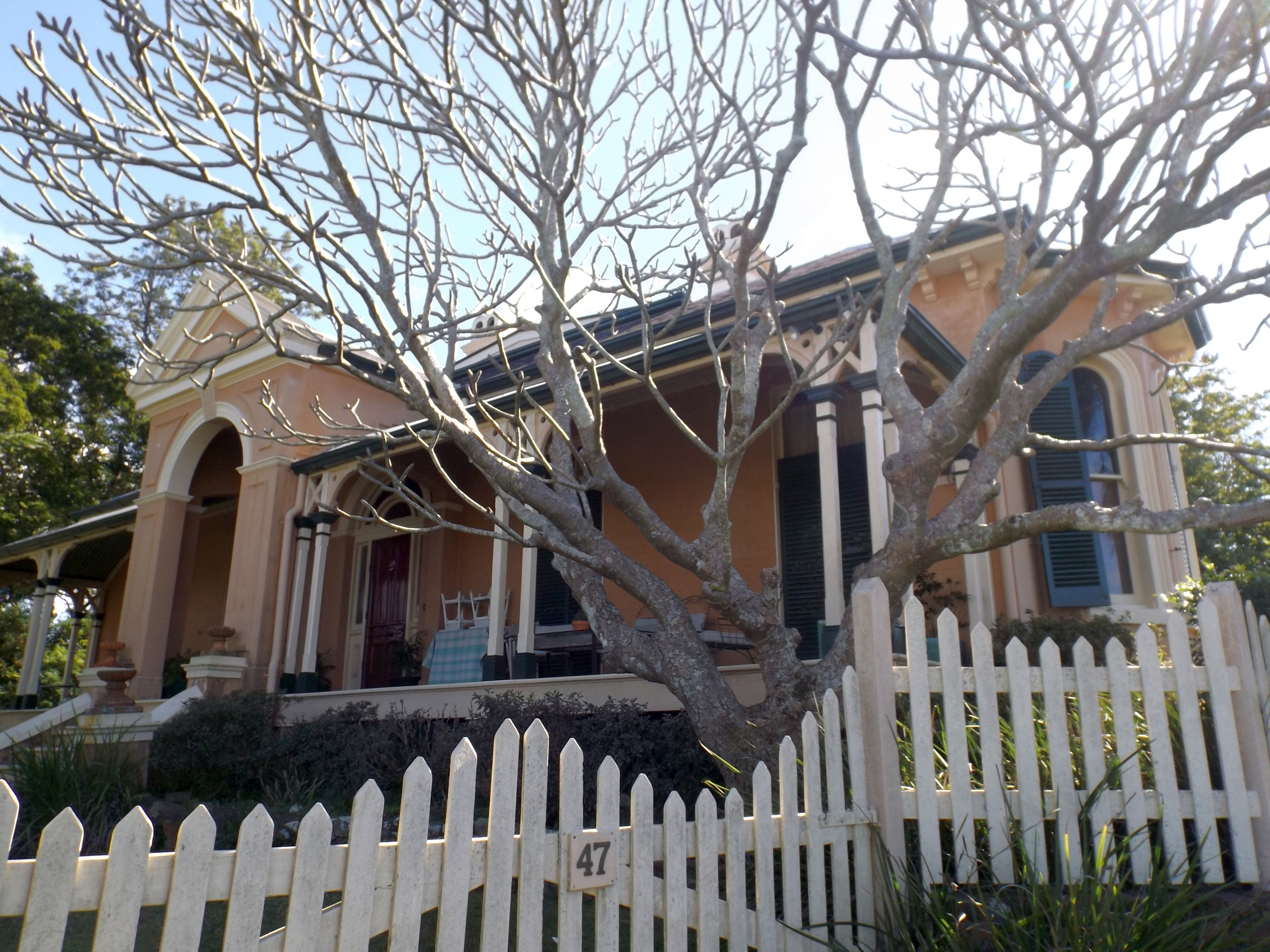
- Residence in 2015

- Location within Queensland Location within Australia
- 27.4328°S 153.0131°E
- Location: 47 Watson Street, Newmarket, City of Brisbane, Queensland, Australia

History
- Design period: 1870s–1890s (late 19th century)
- Built: c. 1876 – c. 1880
- Built for: William Wilson

Site notes
- Architect: James Cowlishaw

Queensland Heritage Register
- Official name: Wilston House
- Type: state heritage (landscape, built)
- Designated: 21 October 1992
- Reference no.: 600344
- Significant period: 1870s, 1880s (fabric, historical)
- Significant components: residential accommodation – main house, trees/plantings, garden/grounds

Wilston House is a heritage-listed villa at 47 Watson Street, Newmarket, City of Brisbane, Queensland, Australia. It was designed by architect James Cowlishaw and built from c. 1876 to c. 1880. It was added to the Queensland Heritage Register on 21 October 1992.

== History ==
This substantial, single-storey brick residence, designed by Brisbane architect James Cowlishaw, was constructed c. 1876 for William Wilson, a mercantile and insurance broker and later Brisbane representative for the Adelaide Milling Company, and a member of the Queensland Legislative Council from 1874 to 1878. The suburb of Wilston derives its name from this residence, which for many years was a prominent landmark in the Newmarket-Wilston district.

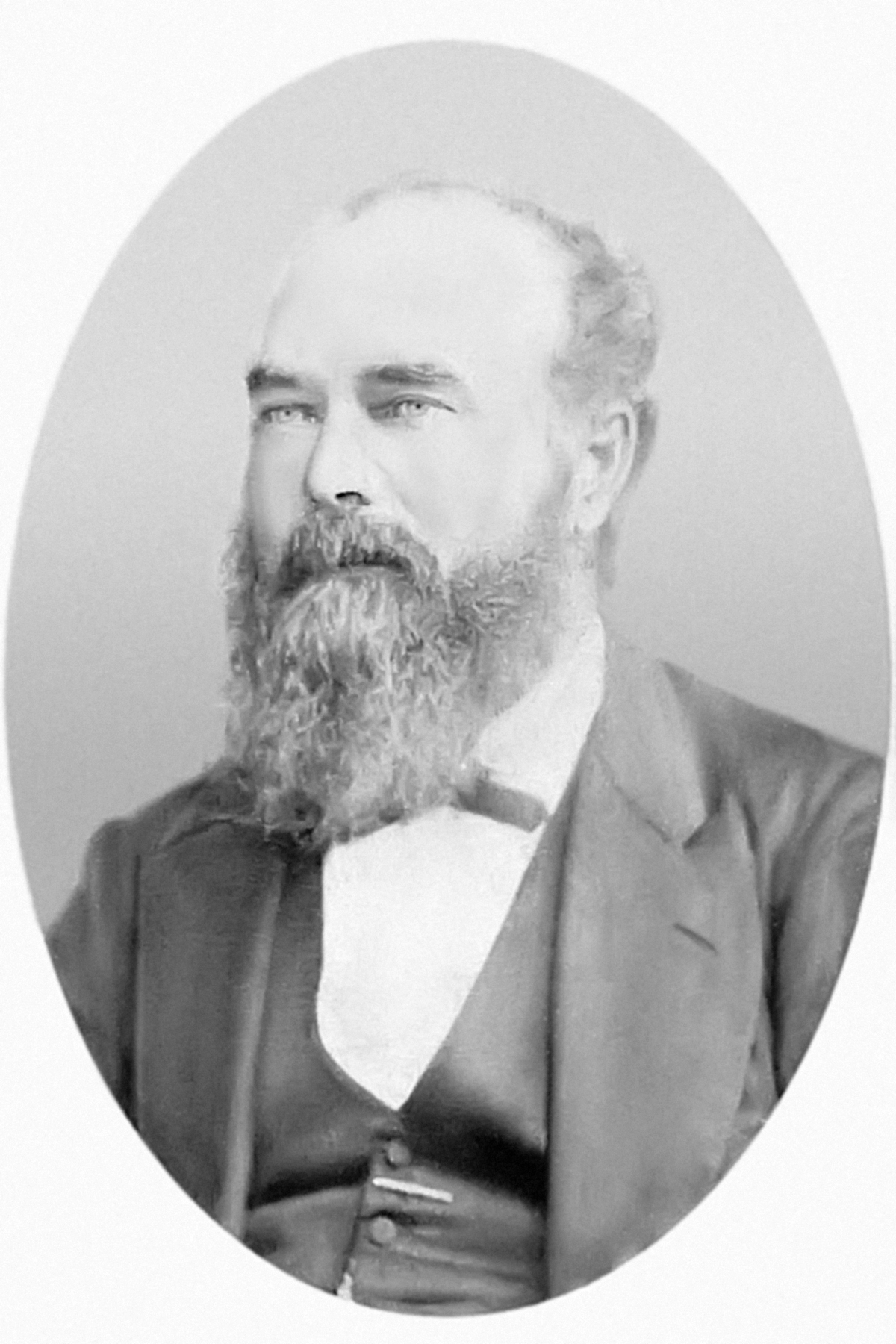
William Wilson, circa 1880

William Wilson, the son of Irish Corn Millers and farmers James Wilson and Mary Richey, was born in Derrykeeghan mills townland via Enniskillen, County Fermanagh Ireland. c. 1832 He arrived in Sydney, Australia in February 1857 on the Star of Peace with his brother James, then to Queensland by August 1858, where he married widow of businessman James Coutts of Enniskillen, Mary Coutts (née Mackay,) who migrated to Brisbane to marry him. He was engaged in mercantile pursuits and from the early 1860s at least, the family resided in Mary Street, near his business. He was a Protestant and a freemason, and became well known in public life.

James Cowlishaw, a Sydney-trained architect and businessman who established his Brisbane architectural practiced in the second half of 1860, appears to have had a long association with William Wilson - one of his earliest Brisbane commissions, in 1861, was for an elegant brick cottage in Mary-street, for Mr Wilson (cost £800 - possibly Frogmore Cottage), where the William Wilsons resided prior to the construction of Wilston House.

Wilston House is situated on part of what was originally portion 269, 46 acres (18.6 hectares) alienated by farmer William Lovell in 1859, with title transferred to William Wilson in July 1868. Wilson amalgamated the land with his own neighbouring portion 265 (which he had acquired in 1859) to create a property of 87.5 acres (35.5 hectares). In May 1875, when both portions were surveyed as part of an application to bring them under the Real Property Act, the land was unoccupied, suggesting that Wilson was not farming here at this period.

In the 1860s and 1870s the district between Enoggera Creek and Kedron Brook was occupied principally by farmers, tanneries along Kedron Brook, and middle class commuter families residing in semi-rural hilltop retreats - such as Daniel Rowntree Somerset's Rosemount (established in the late 1850s), and Justice Cockle's Oakwal (erected 1864–65). These estates were virtually self-supporting, with vegetable gardens, orchards, domestic livestock and dairies. On some properties, crops were cultivated also. Wilston, established in the mid-1870s at the pinnacle of William Wilson's career (during his period as a member of the Queensland Legislative Council), belonged to this tradition.

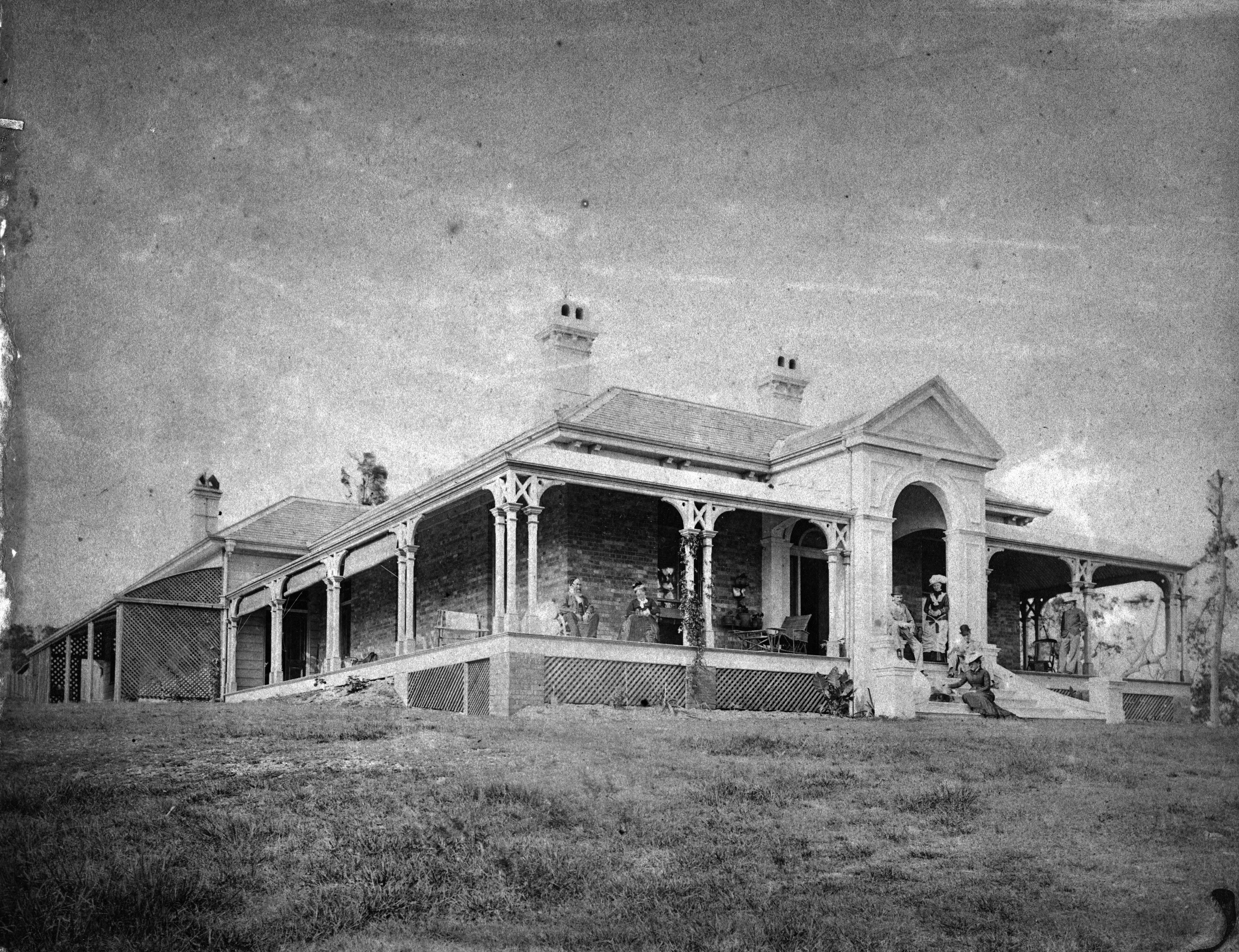
Wilston House circa 1881

In July 1876, James Cowlishaw called tenders for a villa residence at Enoggera for William Wilson, which is understood to refer to Wilston House. Early photographs (circa late 1870s) show a core in face brickwork, with verandahs on three sides (to the west, south and east), a rendered masonry portico to the southern front entrance, a timber section along the north (rear) side of the house with a bay window at the eastern end, and an attached timber kitchen wing at the rear of the main building. The timber section of the house is understood to have contained one large room at the eastern end, divided by two sets of cedar doors from two smaller rooms, possibly guest bedrooms, at the western end. The cedar doors could be opened out to create a ballroom. Whether this wing was part of the original design, or a slightly later addition, is not clear. The portico to the front entrance may be a later addition, as the roof slates continue behind the portico roof structure. Slightly later photographs, thought to have been taken during the Wilsons' residence and therefore prior to 1885, reveal that the core had been rendered and bay windows to the two front rooms (at the southeast and southwest corners of the house) had been added. These matched in design the bay window of the earlier timber section on the north side of the house. By this period, three terraces on the southern (front) side of the house had been established, with concreted steps leading to each. It is understood that the lower terrace contained a croquet or tennis lawn, on which a portable dance floor and marquee could be erected when the Wilsons entertained. The last event Willam Wilson held was the wedding of his stepdaughter, Margaret Coutts, on 20 December 1884 before heading on a trip to America and to his old home in Ireland.

By May 1884, Wilson had raised a £5,000 mortgage on portions 265 and 269 from Sir Arthur Hunter Palmer, KCMG, Premier of Queensland May 1870 to January 1874, acting Queensland Governor 1883 and 1888–89, a director of the Queensland National Bank in the 1880s and early 1890s, and resident at nearby Oakwal through the 1880s. Whether the mortgage was used to finance the additions to Wilston House, or for some other purpose, is not known. Wilson may have been experiencing financial difficulties at this period, because in October 1884, title to Wilston House was transferred to Brisbane businessman and politician John Stevenson, Member of the Queensland Legislative Assembly. One source suggests that Stevenson was part of a syndicate comprising himself, Maurice Hume Black (Member of the Queensland Legislative Assembly for Mackay and Minister for Lands), and William Graham (Member of the Queensland Legislative Council and a director of BD Morehead & Co.). At the same time as Stevenson acquired title to Wilston House, he (or the syndicate) used the property to help raise a mortgage of £22,500 from the Queensland Investment and Land Mortgage Co. Ltd - of which Sir Arthur Palmer was a director and principal shareholder.

The Wilsons left Wilston House and Stevenson subdivided the estate c. 1884-85. In May 1885 Brisbane auctioneer John Cameron (later a director of the Queensland National Bank) auctioned the first section of the Wilston Estate, comprising over 300 residential allotments and Wilston House on about 8 acres of land. The residence was described at this time as comprising drawing and dining rooms elegantly finished, entrance hall, library, breakfast room, five bedrooms (all lofty, spacious, and well ventilated) - verandahs, kitchen, servants' quarters, scullery and storeroom. The grounds contained stables, carriage-house, buggy-shed, harness-room, man's room and hay-house - (possibly housed in one or two structures) - underground tanks holding a domestic water supply, and a flower garden.

Wilston House did not sell at this time, and was advertised for rent in December 1885. Squatter James Tolson (of the pastoral firm of Tolson and Cameron) occupied the house for a few years, and on the Wilston Estate reputedly conducted experiments in freezing mutton for export to Britain. (His landlord, John Stevenson, was a director of the Queensland Meat Export and Agricultural Co.)

Wilston House remained a rental property in Stevenson's name until 1898, when title to the house on about 27.2 acres (11 hectares) passed to his former business associate Boyd Dunlop Morehead, MLA and premier from 1888 to 1890, founder of BD Morehead and Co, and a former director of the Queensland National Bank. Morehead installed the Ladner family as caretakers but they left in 1899, the same year in which title passed to Morehead's mortgagor on the property, the Queensland National Bank.

In 1900, the Queensland National Bank sold Wilston House on 8 acres 3 roods to Major WG Cahill, for £1230. Cahill paid off the house in monthly instalments, which may account for why title was not transferred to him until 1915. Major William Geoffrey Cahill was under secretary of the Queensland Justice Department 1890–1905, Queensland Commissioner of Police 1905–1917, and honorary aide-de-camp to two Queensland governors in the period 1912–16. He was resident at Wilston House by 1906, and possibly earlier, but this is not clear from the Queensland Post Office Directories.

Local knowledge suggests that the Duke of Cornwall and York (later King George V) visited Wilston House with the Governor of Queensland, Lord Lamington, during the May 1901 Royal Tour to celebrate Federation.

In December 1925, by which time an extension of Watson Street had been surveyed close to Wilston House, the Wilston Hill Estate was again offered at public auction. The house on a little over one acre (.4 hectare), and several surrounding allotments, were purchased by Major Alex Wynyard-Joss, with title transferred in June 1927. Cahill remained resident at Wilston House as Wynyard-Joss' tenant until c. 1928. In the late 1920s the timber extension and service wing were demolished, and in its place a verandah was constructed along the northern side of the house. Major Wynyard-Joss also renovated the interior, installing electricity and a new bathroom and kitchen, and in 1930 took up residence at Wilston House with his bride. In the 1940s the house block was subdivided yet again, with the two lower southern terraces, and part of the grounds to the north and west of the house, were sold for residential purposes.

Major Wynyard-Joss died in 1954, and the property ultimately passed to his daughter. In 1982–83, a cottage studio was erected in the grounds, to the northwest of the main house.

== Description ==
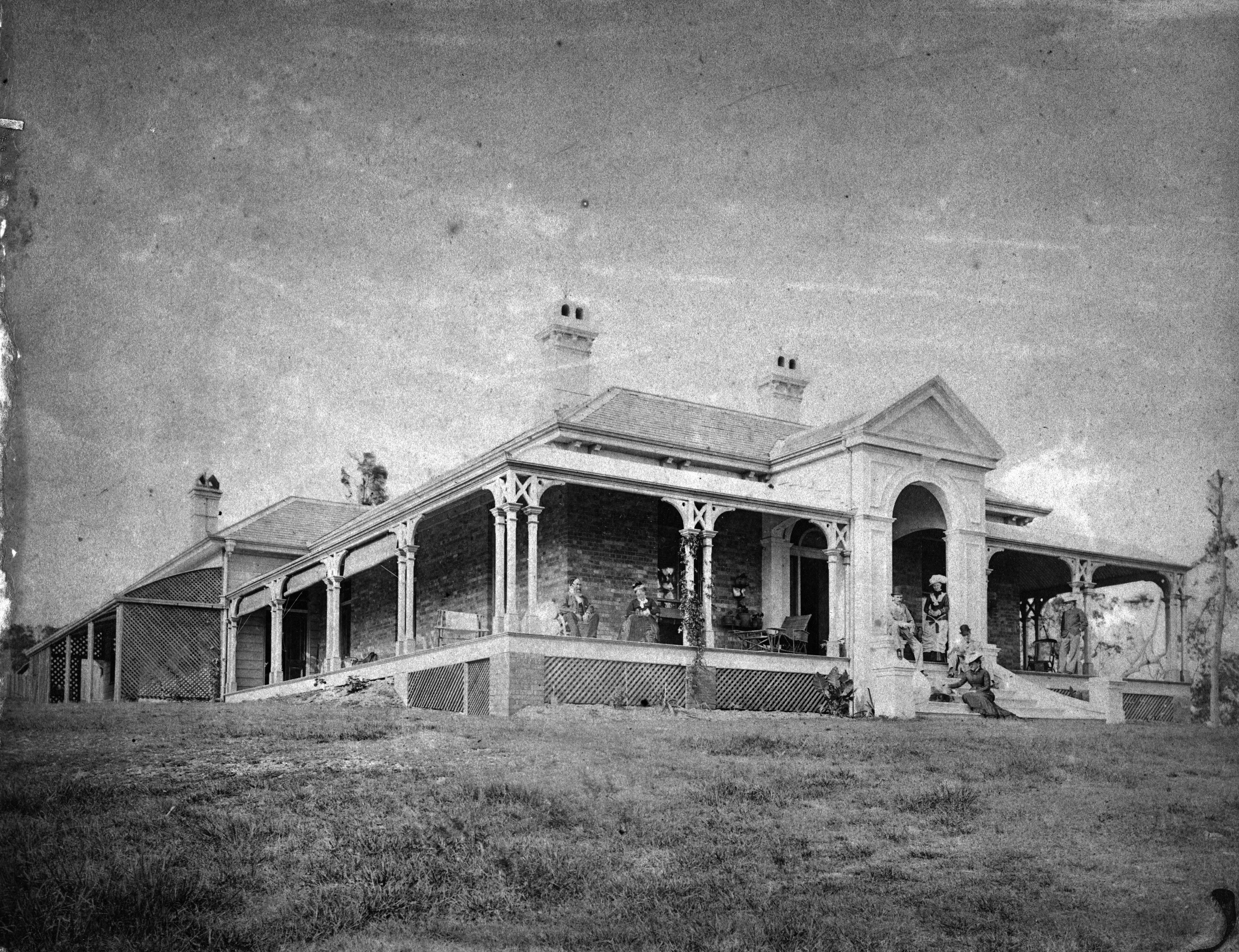
Wilston House, circa 1881

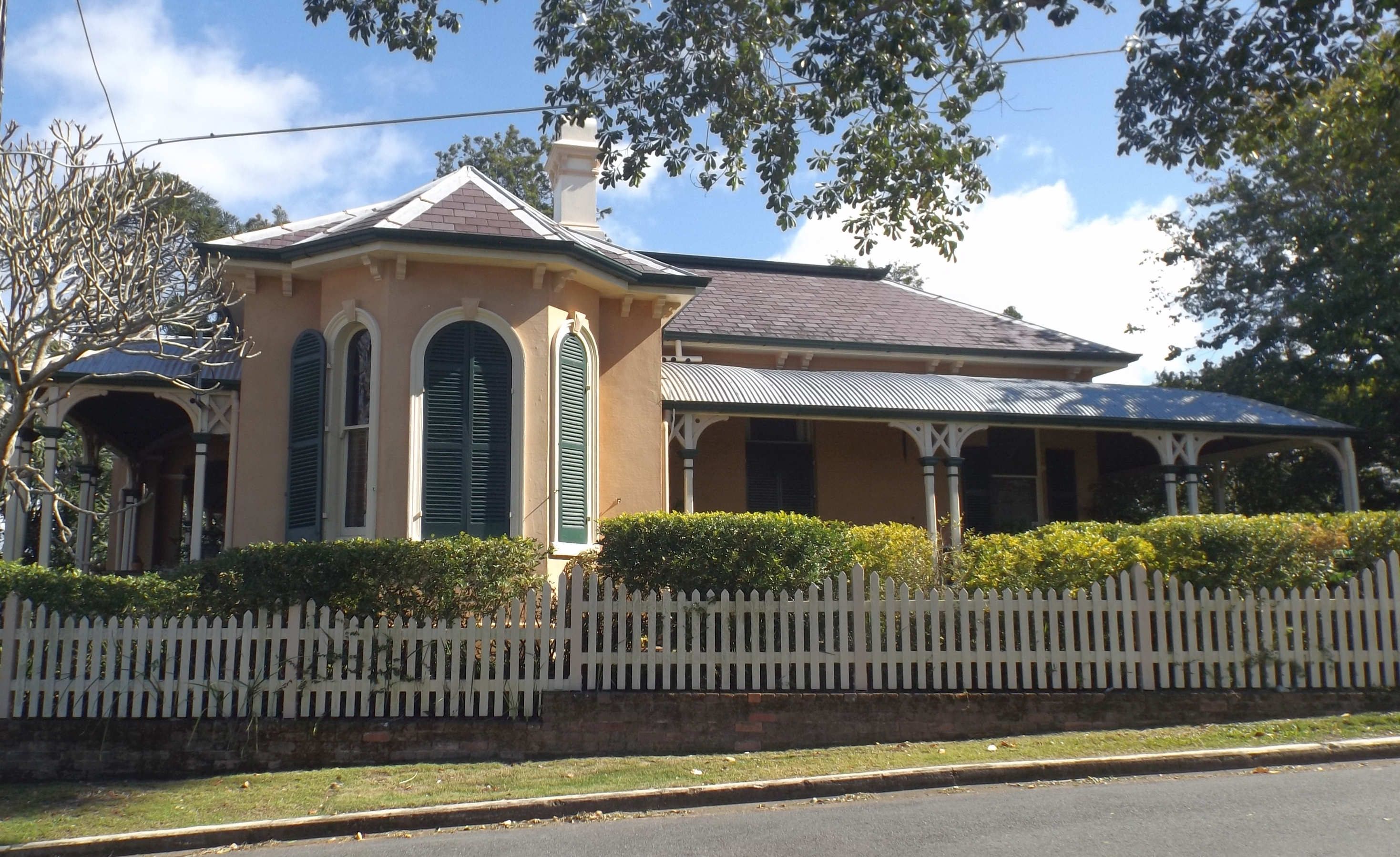
Building in 2015

Wilston House occupies a dominant hilltop position above Wilston and Newmarket. It is a substantial, single-storeyed, low-set brick residence, principally Georgian in style with vernacular influences in the wide verandahs to all sides.

The core, which consists of a central hallway and six rooms, is roofed with Welsh slate. Initially the hipped roof had a central well over the hallway, but this was covered with a low gabled iron roof by 1925.

A rendered masonry portico with pediment distinguishes the arched front entrance, and from each room French doors with arched lights, fanlights and shutters open onto the verandahs.

Convex iron verandah roofs are separated from the main roof by a small cornice and timber console brackets, and are supported by paired wooden posts with cross-braced capitals and timber brackets.

The 1880s brick renovations are rendered to resemble ashlar, and it is likely the face brickwork was first painted at this time. Wilston House presents a highly intact facade, with a recent kalsomine coating to the exterior brickwork and render and a Welsh slate roof.

Internally the house is substantially intact, although friezes and a dado decoration in the hallway have been painted over. Cedar has been used for the hallway flooring, and much of the joinery, including the fixed seating in the bay windows and some of the mantelpieces. The remainder of the internal flooring is of pine. There are pressed metal ceilings and some cast iron mantelpieces - part of the 1880s renovations. Plaster columns in the drawing room, also part of the 1880s redecoration, have been removed. A bathroom occupies what was previously the linen room, and the kitchen is located in a former bedroom.

The site has been reduced to a suburban allotment. A sympathetically designed detached brick studio has been erected in the north west corner of the property. The grounds are bordered to north and west by large trees, including a large, mature Moreton Bay fig (Ficus macrophylla) in the northwest corner of the block, which dates possibly to the 1870s. On the eastern side of Watson Street, opposite the back gate to Wilston House, is a large, mature weeping fig (Ficus benjamina) and two other mature trees: a jacaranda and a tupelo hybrid (Nyssa spp), which once formed part of the grounds of Wilston House and are understood to be remnants of late 19th or early 20th century planting. These have been included within the heritage listing boundary.

== Heritage listing ==
Wilston House was listed on the Queensland Heritage Register on 21 October 1992 having satisfied the following criteria.

The place is important in demonstrating the evolution or pattern of Queensland's history.

Wilston House and its grounds (comprising the current grounds associated with 47 Watson Street and remnants of the grounds now located on the Watson Street road reserve) are significant historically as evidence of the early middle-class occupation of the hilltops between Enoggera Creek and Kedron Brook, to the immediate north of Brisbane, and remain important in illustrating 1870s middle-class lifestyle in Brisbane.

The place is important in demonstrating the principal characteristics of a particular class of cultural places.

Erected c. 1876, Wilston House is a highly intact, substantial residence, particularly significant for its brick, cedar and slate construction and its Georgian stylistic elements, and important in illustrating the principal characteristics of its type.

The present grounds, and part of what is now Watson Street road reserve, contain many early plantings associated with Wilston House in the late 19th and early 20th centuries, including a large Moreton Bay fig (Ficus macrophylla), a weeping fig (Ficus benjamina), a Jacaranda and a Tupelo hybrid (Nyssa spp). These plantings are significant for what they reveal about species choice and garden design associated with houses of this era and are of aesthetic significance for their contribution to the grounds of Wilston House and also as part of the landmark qualities of Wilston Hill.

The place is important because of its aesthetic significance.

Wilston House is significant also for its landmark quality and aesthetic and historic contribution to the Wilston/Newmarket townscape.

The present grounds, and part of what is now Watson Street road reserve, contain many early plantings associated with Wilston House in the late 19th and early 20th centuries, including a large Moreton Bay fig (Ficus macrophylla), a weeping fig (Ficus benjamina), a Jacaranda and a Tupelo hybrid (Nyssa spp). These plantings are significant for what they reveal about species choice and garden design associated with houses of this era and are of aesthetic significance for their contribution to the grounds of Wilston House and also as part of the landmark qualities of Wilston Hill.

The place has a special association with the life or work of a particular person, group or organisation of importance in Queensland's history.

It is an example of the domestic work of prolific Brisbane architect James Cowlishaw.
