= Fortitude Valley Methodist Church =

Fortitude Valley Methodist Church (former)
- Gregory Place; Epworth Centre
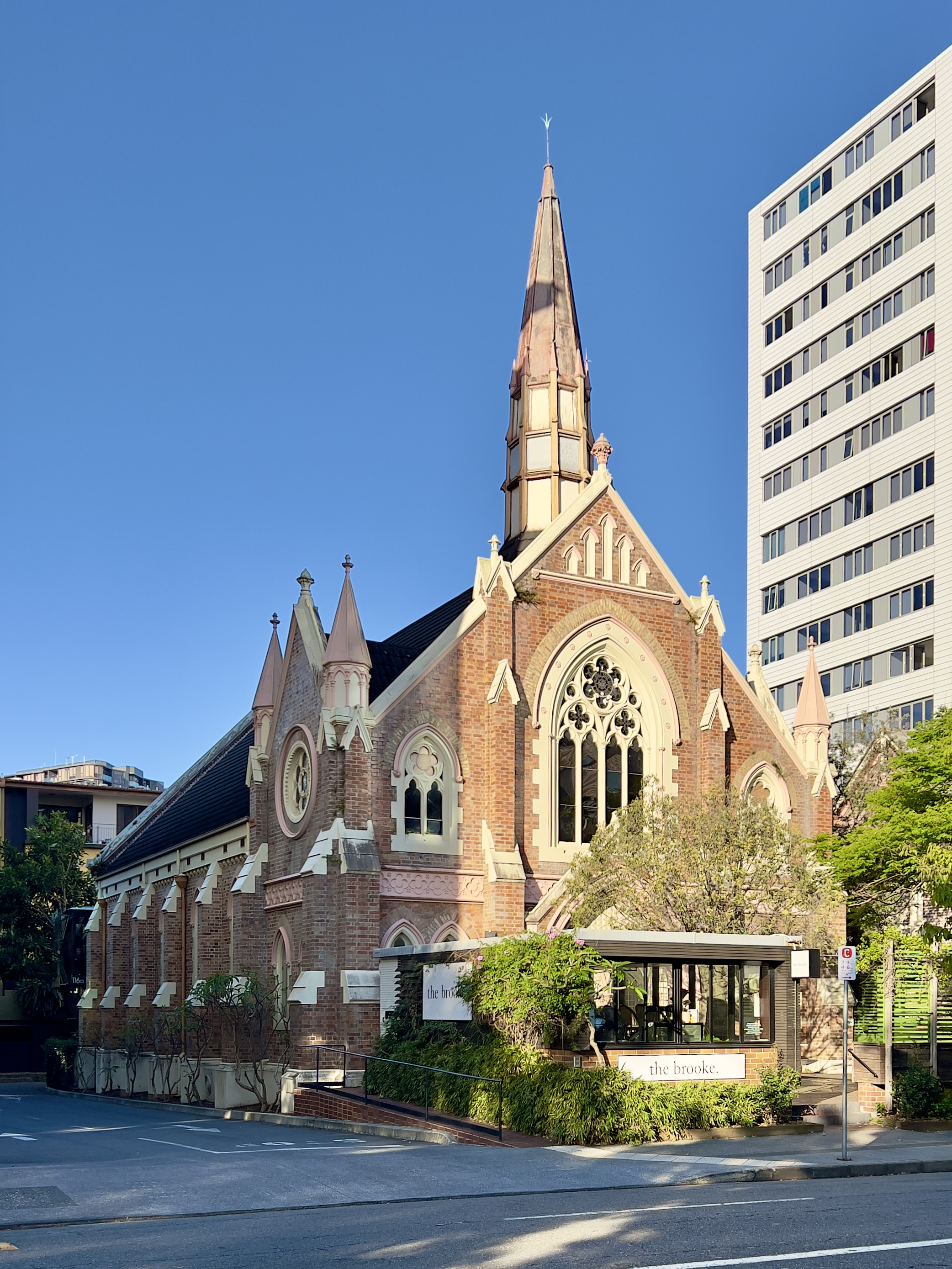
- Former Fortitude Valley Methodist Church, 2022
- Fortitude Valley Methodist Church (former)
- 27°27′14″S 153°02′19″E
- Address: 116–120 Brookes Street, Fortitude Valley, City of Brisbane, Queensland
- Country: Australia
- Previous denomination: Methodist

History
- Former name: Fortitude Valley Wesleyan Church
- Status: Church (1870–1977); Commercial use (since 1977)
- Founded: 31 October 1870 (2nd church); 20 August 1887 (3rd church)
- Dedicated: 26 March 1871 (2nd church); 13 January 1889 (3rd church)

Architecture
- Architects: James Cowlishaw; George Simkin
- Architectural type: Church (former)
- Style: Gothic Revival
- Years built: 1870–1871 (2nd church); 1887–1888 (3rd church)
- Construction cost: £1,050 (2nd church); £4,941 (3rd church)
- Closed: 27 February 1977 (as a church)

Specifications
- Materials: Red brick; concrete

Queensland Heritage Register
- Official name: Gregory Place & Gregory Hall, Epworth Centre, Fortitude Valley Methodist Church and Church Hall, Fortitude Valley Wesleyan Church and Church Hall
- Type: State heritage (built)
- Designated: 21 October 1992
- Reference no.: 600204
- Significant period: 1870–1871, 1887–1888 (fabric); 1871–1977 (historical)
- Builders: Thomas Reading, Blair Cunningham

Fortitude Valley Methodist Church and Hall are a heritage-listed former church (the second church on the site) and its hall at 116–120 Brookes Street, Fortitude Valley, City of Brisbane, Queensland, Australia.

The first church (and later hall) was designed by James Cowlishaw and built from 1870 to 1871 by Thomas Reading. The third church was designed by George Simkin and built from 1887 to 1888 by Blair Cunningham. The complex is also known as Fortitude Valley Wesleyan Church and Church Hall, Gregory Place, Gregory Hall, and the Epworth Centre. The complex was added to the Queensland Heritage Register on 21 October 1992.

Built as a Methodist church, the last service was held in 1977. The former church is used as a commercial showroom.

== History ==
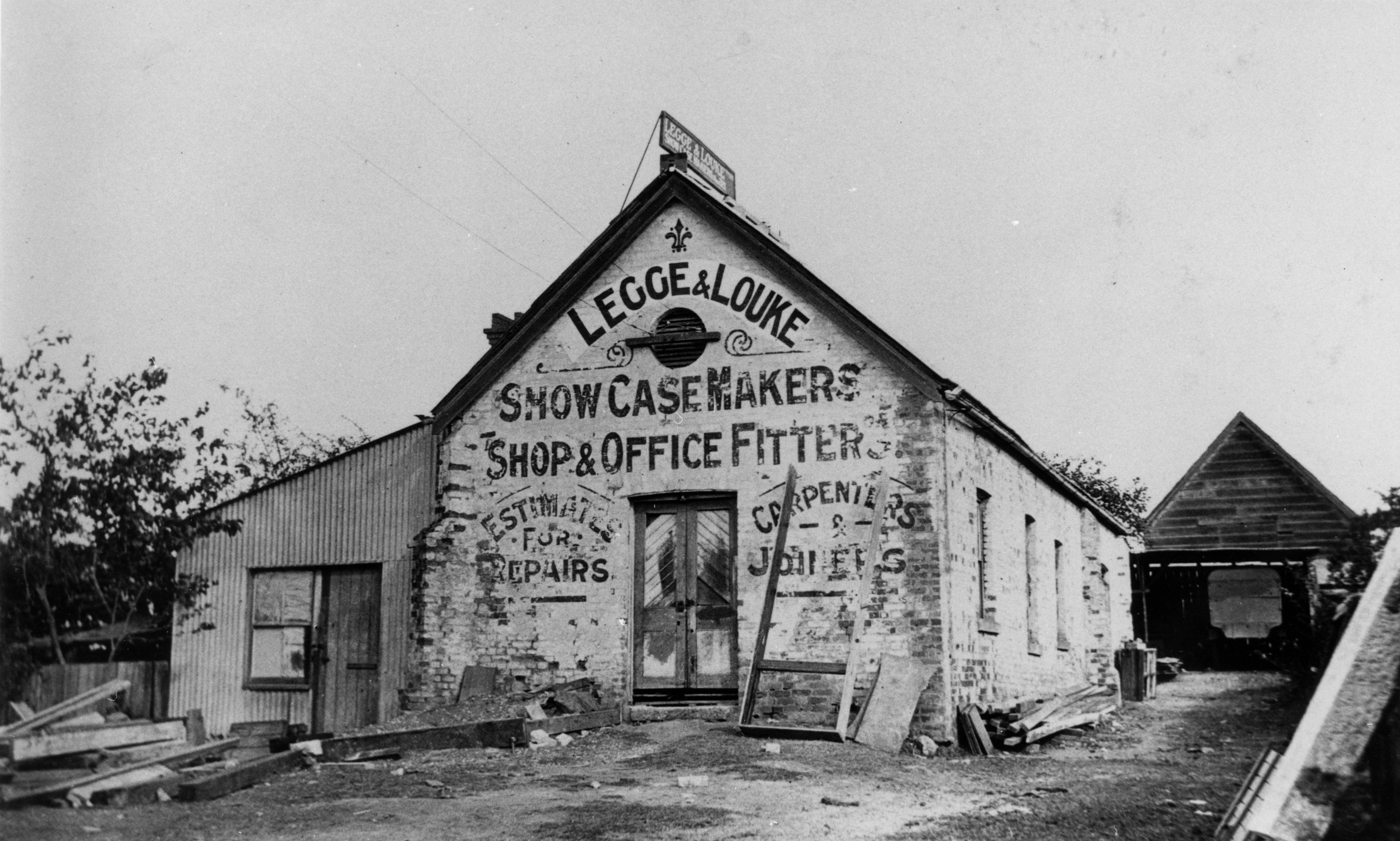
Premises of the first Fortitude Valley Methodist Church being used as a carpenter's shop, Ann Street, circa 1920

The former Fortitude Valley Wesleyan Church and Church Hall were erected in 1887–88 and 1870–71 respectively, on a site in Ann Street granted to the Wesleyan Church by the Crown in 1861. The site fronted what was then known as the Eagle Farm Road (later Ann Street), and included allotments for a church, school and parsonage.

=== First church ===
The first Fortitude Valley Wesleyan Church had been erected on another site in Ann Street in 1856. At that time, Fortitude Valley was part of the Brisbane Circuit.

In 1867, the Brisbane Circuit was divided into two: the Valley and Albert Street. The new Valley Circuit was a large one, embracing Eagle Farm, Nundah and Sandgate, and was centred on the small Ann Street church.

=== Second church ===
In 1870–71, a larger church, which could seat 400 persons, was built on the 1861 land grant, fronting Ann Street. It was the first church to be erected in the new Valley Circuit. The foundation stone was laid on 31 October 1870, and the opening service was held on 26 March 1871. It was designed by Brisbane architect James Cowlishaw and erected by contractor Thomas Reading at a cost of approximately £1,050. At the time, the brick building with its slate roof was one of the most substantial churches in Brisbane.

Also in 1871, a small timber parsonage was constructed at the rear of the church. This building was replaced in 1885 by a larger parsonage, Epworth, at 53 Brookes Street. The original parsonage is no longer extant.

=== Third church ===
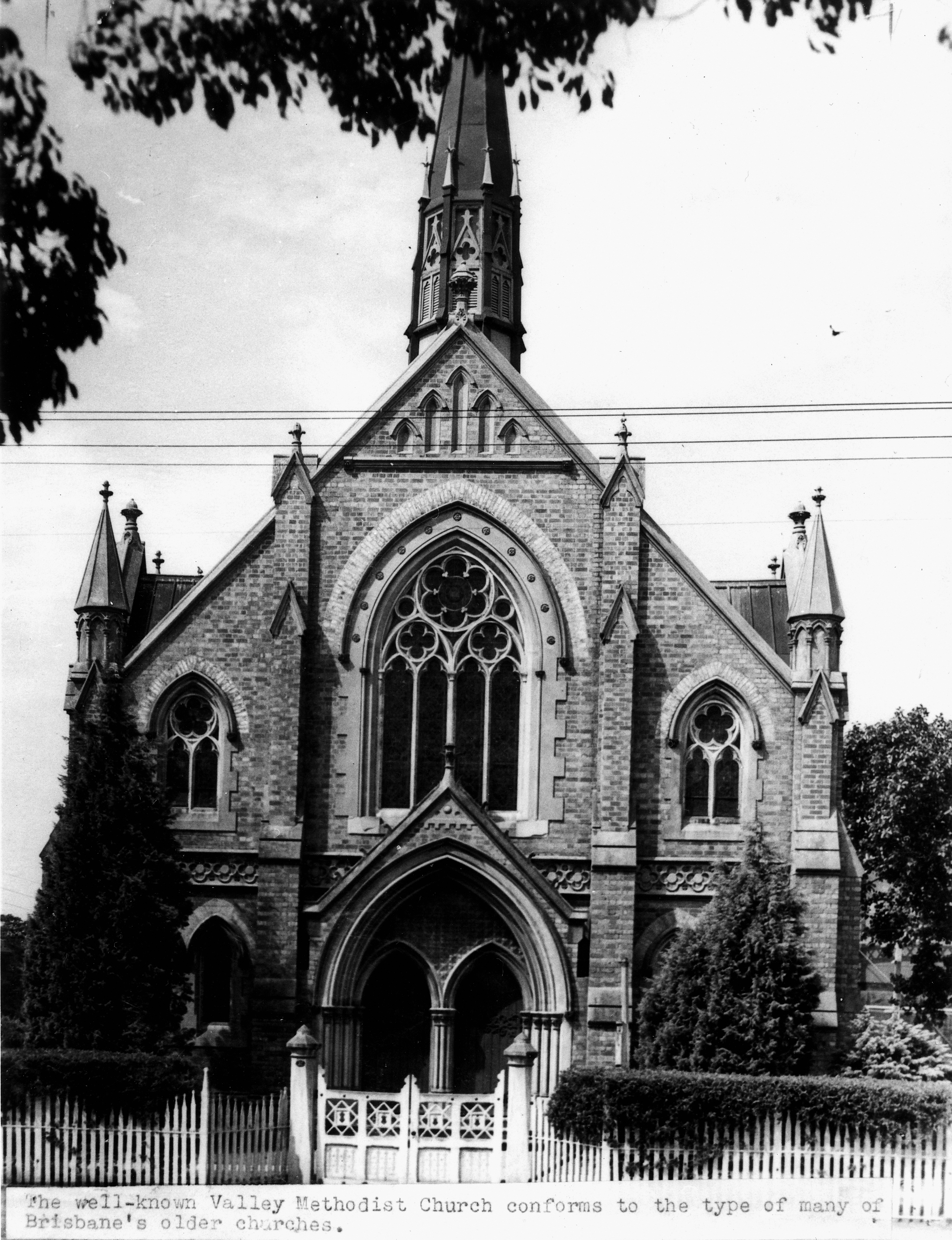
The third Fortitude Valley Wesleyan Church built 1887–1888 at Brookes Street

In the 1880s, the Valley developed as a major retail and residential centre, and Brisbane's northern suburbs expanded as the large estates of the 1860s and 1870s were subdivided. The Valley Wesleyan congregation expanded also, and the decision was taken in 1886 to erect a larger church adjacent to the 1870–71 building, but facing Brookes Street, on the same land grant. The new church was designed by Brisbane architect George Simkin in 1887 and constructed by contractor Blair Cunningham in 1887–88. The final cost of the building, including furniture and fittings, was £4,941. The foundation stone was laid on 20 August 1887, and the opening service was held on 13 January 1889.

The stained glass windows were imported from Munich. The organ, now removed, was commenced in Brisbane by Edward Wauldron in 1887 and completed by Thomas Christmas in 1889. Christmas, who arrived in Brisbane from Melbourne in 1877, was a musical instrument dealer and piano and organ builder, and is credited with having constructed most of the locally made organs in Queensland by 1888.

The vestries were part of in the initial design, but appear to have been added at a later date. The glass windows in these rooms were supplied by Exton & Gough of Brisbane.

After the new church was built, the old church was used as the church hall.

The new Valley Wesleyan Church enhanced the status of Methodism in Brisbane. For a short time prior to the new Albert Street Wesleyan Church (Albert Street Uniting Church), erected in 1888–89, gaining prominence, the new Valley church was the leading Wesleyan church in the city.

The Valley Wesleyan Church has been described as a "Mother of Churches". From here, many Northern Brisbane suburban churches were opened, from Windsor to North Pine and Sandgate, which ultimately became centres of new circuits.

Following the 1898 unification of Queensland's various Methodist groups – Wesleyans, Primitive Methodists, Bible Christians, and United Free Methodists – the Brookes Street church became known as the Fortitude Valley Methodist Church.

=== Closure as a church ===
Following the establishment of the Uniting Church in 1977, the Fortitude Valley Methodist Church and Church Hall were closed, with the final service, revoking their status as sacred buildings, conducted on 27 February 1977.

The secular buildings were renamed the Epworth Centre; the former church was leased to the TN! Theatre Company to use for performances with the Valley Child Care Centre operating from the hall. In 1985 the buildings were sold to the Royal Geographical Society of Australasia Queensland Incorporated, and renamed Gregory Place and Gregory Hall, in honour of former Queensland explorer and surveyor-general, Sir Augustus Charles Gregory. Both buildings were refurbished as offices, with the headquarters of the Royal Geographical Society located in the 1871 building (Gregory Hall). Later, the Royal Geographical Society relocated to Milton. In 2015, the church is occupied by a furniture company.

== Description ==
The Fortitude Valley Methodist Church (1888) and Hall (1871) are two Gothic-influenced red-brick and cement-render former churches. The buildings sit at right angles to each other; Gregory Place fronts Brookes Street, while Gregory Hall runs parallel to the street. The buildings are complementary in form, detail and materials, although the 1888 church is more elaborately ornamented. The buildings sit within and contribute to both a late nineteenth century streetscape and a precinct of Gothic influenced church buildings.

The modest 1871 building is a simple hall with buttressed brick walls and a steeply pitched corrugated iron roof. It has single triangular head lancet windows between buttresses to the side walls. The south-eastern elevation, formerly the "front" elevation to Ann Street, has a central pointed arch entrance, flanked by paired lancets, with a group of three lancets to the pinnacle of the gable. The north-western elevation has two pointed arched entrances and a group of three lancets.

The ornamentation of openings and wall surfaces is also modest but fine: the windows have slightly projecting corbelled triangular heads; the end gables have brick pointed arch courses above the grouped windows; the windows sills, buttress copings and plinth are picked out in cement render, and diagonal brick end courses decorate the sills, cornice and plinth.

The interior of the 1871 building is painted brick, spanned by timber hammerbeam trusses landing on impost blocks. The ceiling is timber-lined with exposed rafters, and is finished with a band of diagonally laid brick ends. The windows are diamond-glazed. The refurbishment of the interior has included an extensive timber mezzanine, with beams which abut existing walls, exposed air conditioning ducts, new toilets and a kitchen.

The 1888 building is also essentially a simple hall, embellished with parapeted gables with turrets at the ends, and rich decoration of openings and wall surfaces. It has a steeply pitched concrete tiled roof, with an octagonal spire springing from the ridge. A gabled annex is attached to the rear.

The building has buttressed walls, pointed arched tracery windows, and rosette windows to the gable ends. The street elevation has a recessed entry with floriated colonnettes surmounted by a large tracery window and small lancet windows. The building is decorated with white cement render to copings, cornices and window surrounds; it also has stone hood mouldings, beige brick voussoirs, a dado with quatrefoil motifs and a rendered plinth. The gables and turrets to the Brookes Street end are topped with small finials.

The 1888 building has a rendered masonry interior, with an organ recess and vestry to the north-eastern end, and a timber panelled entry vestibule at the south-western end. The latter contains a timber World War I Honour Roll, and is flanked by timber stairs leading to a timber choir loft supported by two floriated colonnettes. The roof is supported by timber hammerbeam trusses with a king post landing on floriated imposts, and has a diagonally timbered ceiling with exposed purlins and triangular vents, which is finished with a deep plaster cornice. The two gables to the side elevations are expressed in the ceiling over the choir loft, and a horizontal timber panel with a carved rose covers the base of the spire. The organ recess has a stencilled, half-domed ceiling with a rich moulding to its reveal, and is framed with floriated colonettes.

The windows are mostly richly patterned stained glass, including two-light tracery windows lining the east and west walls, a larger four-light window over the choir loft, and rosettes to the side gables and above the organ recess. The internal refurbishment is similar to that of the 1870 building, and has included an extensive timber mezzanine with beams which abut existing walls, exposed air conditioning ducts, new toilets and a kitchen in the vestry area, and additional partitioning for offices.

Externally, the two buildings are unusually complementary in form, materials and details, the later building being a richer elaboration of the modest but fine earlier building. The 1871 building contains some fine, simple timber and brick detailing, while the 1888 interior comprises more lavish plaster and carved timber decoration. Much of the buildings remain intact in form and detail. The spatial quality of the interiors, however, has been substantially altered by the installation of the mezzanine, air conditioning ducts and new partitioning.

== Heritage listing ==
The former Fortitude Valley Methodist Church and Hall were listed on the Queensland Heritage Register on 21 October 1992 having satisfied the following criteria.

The place is important in demonstrating the evolution or pattern of Queensland's history.

The church and hall are important in demonstrating the pattern of Queensland's history, providing evidence of the development and growth of the Wesleyan Church in Brisbane and as one of a group of substantial churches built in Fortitude Valley in the 1870s and 1880s, reflecting the residential growth of the Valley and adjacent suburbs in the last quarter of the 19th century.

The place is important in demonstrating the principal characteristics of a particular class of cultural places.

The 1888 building demonstrates the principal characteristics of a substantial, ornate, brick church of the late 1880s, in Brisbane.

The place is important because of its aesthetic significance.

The buildings exhibit aesthetic characteristics which are valued by the community, in particular; their aesthetic cohesion due to their complementary scale, form, detail and materials, their contribution to both the Brookes Street townscape and the precinct of Gothic-influenced church buildings which includes the Holy Trinity Church and Rectory, the modest but fine quality of the detailing of the 1871 building and the fine and elaborate quality of the crafted elements of the 1888 building, in particular the stained glass windows and ornaments to the buildings fabric in timber, stone and plaster.

The place has a strong or special association with a particular community or cultural group for social, cultural or spiritual reasons.

The church and hall have a special association as the "Mother Church" from which most of the North Brisbane Methodist churches, from Windsor to Sandgate and North Pine, devolved.

The place has a special association with the life or work of a particular person, group or organisation of importance in Queensland's history.

The church and hall have a special association with the work of the Methodist Church, in particular that of the Wesleyan Church, in Brisbane from 1870 to 1977 and with Brisbane architects James Cowlishaw and George Simkin, being examples of their ecclesiastical work.
