= Eskgrove =

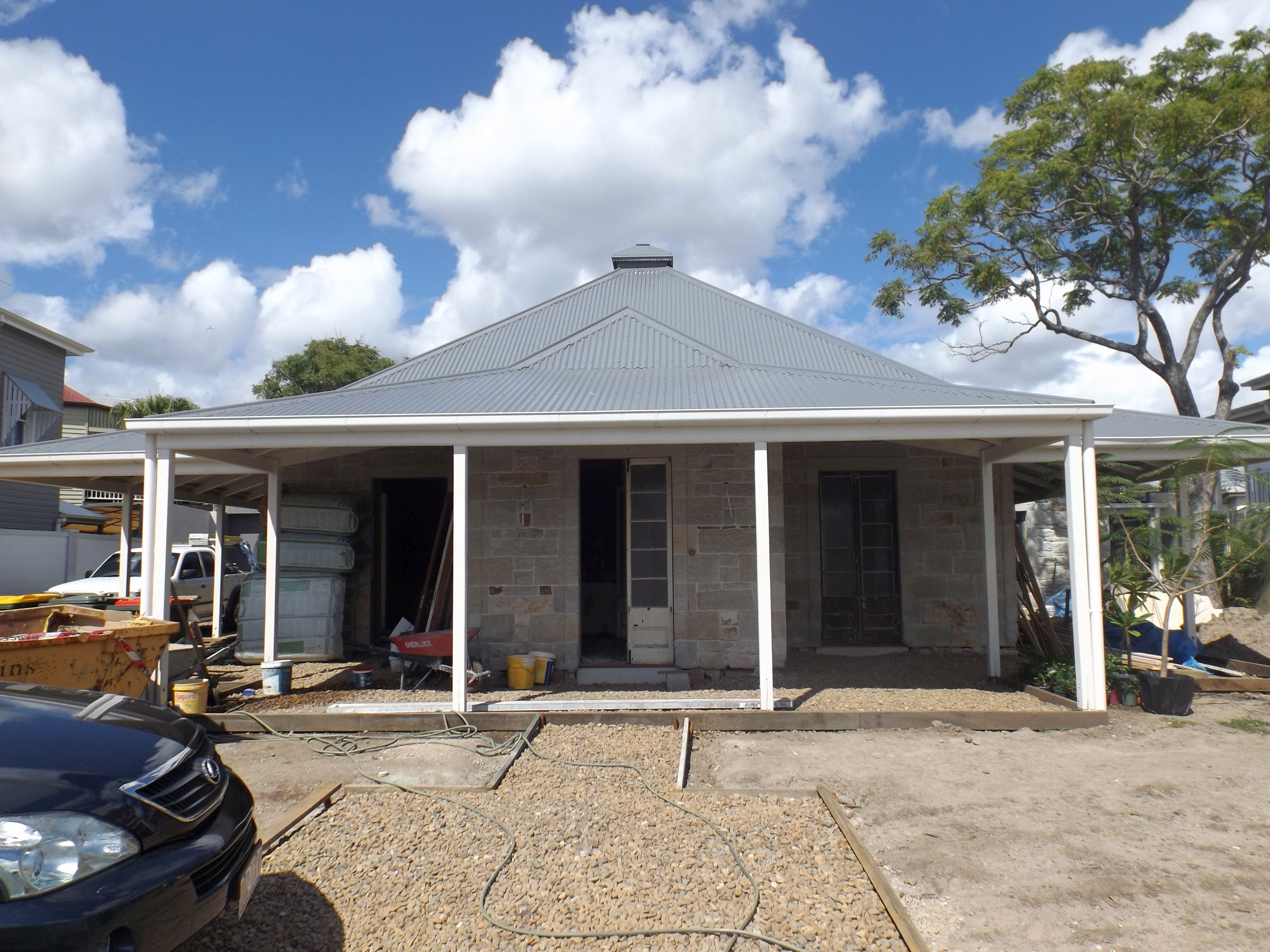
- Renovations in 2015

- Location within Queensland Location within Australia
- 27.4784°S 153.0467°E
- Location: 56 Laidlaw Parade, East Brisbane, Queensland, Australia

History
- Design period: 1840s–1860s (mid-19th century)
- Built: 1853–

Queensland Heritage Register
- Official name: Eskgrove, Eskgrove Cottage, Grey Eagles
- Type: state heritage (built)
- Designated: 21 October 1992
- Reference no.: 600187
- Significant period: 1850s (fabric); 1850s–1870s (historical); 1850s– (social)
- Significant components: service wing, residential accommodation – main house, extension/s or addition/s

Eskgrove is a heritage-listed detached house at 56 Laidlaw Parade, East Brisbane, Queensland, Australia. It was built from 1853 onwards. It is also known as Eskgrove Cottage and Grey Eagles. It was added to the Queensland Heritage Register on 21 October 1992.

== History ==
This single-storeyed stone residence was erected in 1853 for former Sydney bank manager Archibald Hepburn Hutchinson, on land he had acquired from surveyor James Charles Burnett earlier the same year.

Burnett had alienated Eastern Suburban Allotments 51–53, a property of just over 12.5 acres (5.1 ha) fronting the Brisbane River near Norman Creek, between November 1851 and December 1852. Whether Burnett resided on this land is not clear. Hutchinson acquired title to all three allotments in February 1853, for the sum of £88/10/1. It is likely that a report in The Moreton Bay Courier of 18 June 1853, mentioning the construction for Mr Hutchinson of a stone building for a dwelling house, on the bank of the river below Kangaroo Point, refers to the construction of Eskgrove.

By the mid-1850s there were only three river estates along the south bank of the Brisbane River from Shafston Reach to Norman Creek: Shafston House (commenced in 1851 as Ravenscott for Rev. Robert Creyke and completed in 1852 for Henry Stuart Russell); the Rev. Thomas Mowbray's Riversdale (probably constructed c. 1851 – now the site of Mowbray Park) and Eskgrove. All three houses were of stone construction.

Hutchinson died at Eskgrove in 1854, following which his wife and children appear to have returned to Sydney. Their Brisbane house was retained as a rental property. Eskgrove was a middle-class residence with fine river views, and was occupied by a number of persons prominent in the development of early Queensland, including squatters William Kent Jr (1857–58) and Thomas Lodge Murray-Prior (1858–59), Governor Bowen's private secretary Abram Moriarty (1859–60), Lieutenant George Poynter Heath, RN, Portmaster of Queensland (c. 1861–c. 1865) and Robert Kerr Acheson by 1868.

The Brisbane Courier of 26 September 1868 described the property as pleasantly situated on the bank of the river, containing six rooms, with kitchen and two servants' rooms, stables and outhouses attached, standing in a well grassed thirteen acre paddock and has a kitchen garden.

By 1876 William David Nisbet, Chief Engineer Harbours and Rivers, had taken up residence. However, it appears that the place still retained a close association with the Hutchinson family, for when Catherine Isabella Hutchinson (Archibald's daughter) married squatter Andrew Bowman in March 1877, her normal place of residence was given as Eskgrove, Brisbane.

In 1880 Nisbet purchased the house and the whole of the Eskgrove estate from the Hutchinson family for £2,000. Title was transferred to Brisbane businessmen NJ Howes and AS Leslie in 1885, at which time the estate was subdivided and Thomas Scanlan, a Woolloongabba publican and later Mayor of South Brisbane, purchased the house and about 4 acres (1.6 ha) of land. An 1885 plan of the Eskgrove Estate, shows that the house comprised a square core with one large rear wing, with a shed and stables located between the house and Lytton Road.

Following Scanlan's death in December 1892, Eskgrove again became a rental property. As part of the realisation of Scanlan's estate, Eskgrove was offered for sale early in 1895, at which time the property comprised a stone house with a timber wing and timber outbuildings on 2 roods 33.3 perches (2,870 m^{2}) (this included a river frontage, as Laidlaw Parade did not yet extend between Scanlan and Eskgrove streets), plus another 3 acres (1.2 ha) 1 rood 7.1 perches (1,190 m^{2}) with a long frontage to the Brisbane River and to Lytton Road. By 1902 Laidlaw Parade had been extended between Scanlan and Eskgrove streets, and Eskgrove house and land (still the 1885 subdivisions) was offered at auction as the Scanlan Estate. At this time the earlier rear timber wing appears to have been replaced and the shed and stables had been removed, but a cottage, not shown on the 1885 estate map and associated with the house, was located on the river side of Laidlaw Parade, to the west of the main residence.

Eskgrove remained a rental property, despite transfers of title in 1905 and 1910, until the Joseph Walter Tritton family, who owned the property from 1910 to 1966, made it their family home about 1920. In later years the house apparently was used as flats and then a nursing home called Grey Eagles. During these years the building was variously extended and modified. Since 1975 the house has been occupied as a private residence, and renamed Eskgrove.

In 2010, Eskgrove was sold for $1,000,000 and again in 2012 for $1,070,000.

== Description ==
This is an 1850s low-set, single-storeyed sandstone house which originally consisted of a square stone core with a projecting front room and a rear service wing.

The house has a steep sloping broken-back corrugated iron roof topped by a pyramidal chimney ventilator. External walls are painted pebble dash render over the original sandstone, with plain margins along the base line, wall edges and around the doors.

There is a verandah on three sides of the core and a pavilion on the rear eastern side. The front and western verandahs are supported by precast aluminium doric columns. Pairs of French doors on either side of the projecting vestibule have wooden shutters.

Brick walls divide the interior into four rooms. The two front rooms share a back-to-back fireplace. French doors provide assess between rooms and onto the verandah.

The rear wing also has a broken-back roof and is built of stone with a timber pediment back and front. In 1985 this wing comprised three bedrooms.

Various rear extensions in asbestos sheeting and weatherboards include bathrooms, extended verandah and laundry.

Many mature trees provide ample shade for this pre-separation colonial dwelling which remains substantially intact in form.

== Heritage listing ==
Eskgrove was listed on the Queensland Heritage Register on 21 October 1992 having satisfied the following criteria.

The place is important in demonstrating the evolution or pattern of Queensland's history.

Eskgrove, constructed in 1853, is a rare surviving Brisbane pre-separation residence, closely associated with the earliest riverine development of the eastern suburbs. Associated with a number of persons significant in the early development of Queensland, the place contributes to the understanding of residential and social hierarchies in early Brisbane, and of the role of the Brisbane River within this structure.

The place demonstrates rare, uncommon or endangered aspects of Queensland's cultural heritage.

Eskgrove, constructed in 1853, is significant historically as a rare surviving Brisbane pre-separation residence, closely associated with the earliest riverine development of the eastern suburbs.

The place is important in demonstrating the principal characteristics of a particular class of cultural places.

Eskgrove is significant as important evidence of 1850s stone construction techniques in Queensland, and of the early adaptation of Georgian design to Brisbane lifestyle and climate.

The place has a strong or special association with a particular community or cultural group for social, cultural or spiritual reasons.

The place is valued by the community for its early association with the development of East Brisbane, and as one of the earliest surviving residences in Brisbane.
