= James Cowlishaw =

Australian politician (1834–1929)

The Hon James Cowlishaw
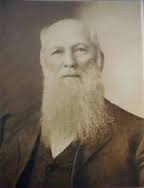

Member of the Queensland Legislative Council
- In office 18 April 1878 – 23 March 1922

Personal details
- Born: James Cowlishaw; 19 December 1834 Sydney, Australia
- Died: 25 July 1929 (aged 94) Brisbane, Queensland, Australia
- Resting place: Toowong Cemetery
- Spouse: Charlotte Owen (m.1862 d.1914)
- Occupation: Architect, auditor, company director, bimetallist

James Cowlishaw (19 December 1834 – 25 July 1929) was an architect, businessman and politician in Queensland (initially a colony, then a state of Australia from 1901).

== Early life ==
Cowlishaw was born in Sydney, where he was educated at St. James's Grammar School, and went to Queensland in 1861 to practise as an architect.

== Politics ==
On 18 April 1878 he was appointed to a seat in the Queensland Legislative Council and held it until the council was abolished in March 1922.

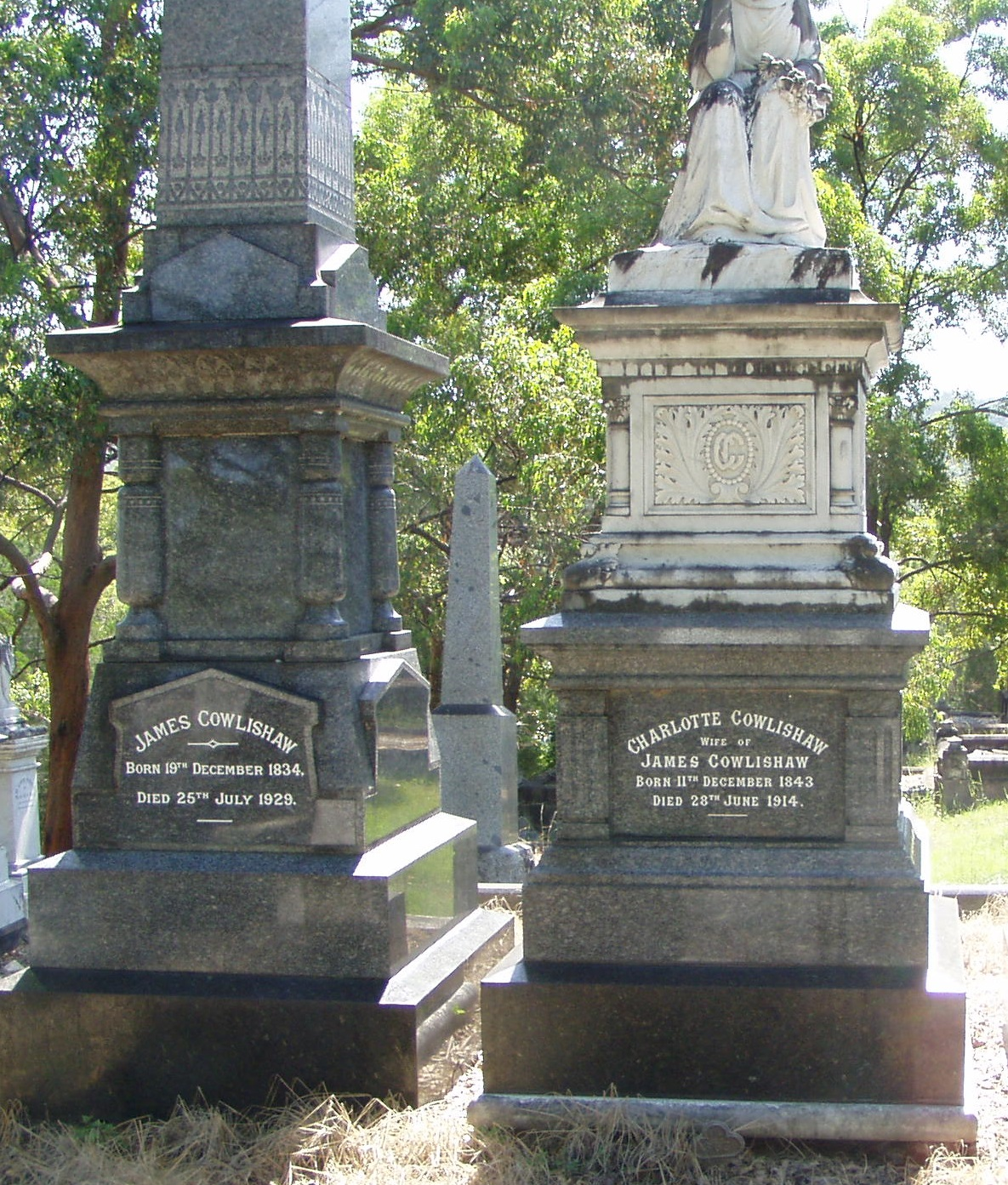
The graves of James and Charlotte Cowlishaw

== Business ==
Cowlishaw was part proprietor and managing director for some years of the Brisbane Evening Telegraph, but sold his interest in the newspaper in 1885.

Cowlishaw founded the Brisbane Gas Company in 1864, was auditor from 1869 to 1873 and then became a director. He then succeeded Lewis Bernays as chairman in March 1879, and held that position until 1920.

== Later life ==
Cowlishaw died in Bowen Hills, Brisbane, Queensland and was buried in Toowong Cemetery.

== Works ==
His architectural works include:

- Fortitude Valley Methodist Church (1870)
- Hanworth, East Brisbane
- Oakwal
- Wilston House
- The Menzies Hotel, later Kingsley Private Hotel, a series of 5 terrace houses on George Street, opposite the Bellvue Hotel and adjacent to the Queensland Club. The buildings were demolished in 1979.
