= Shafston House =

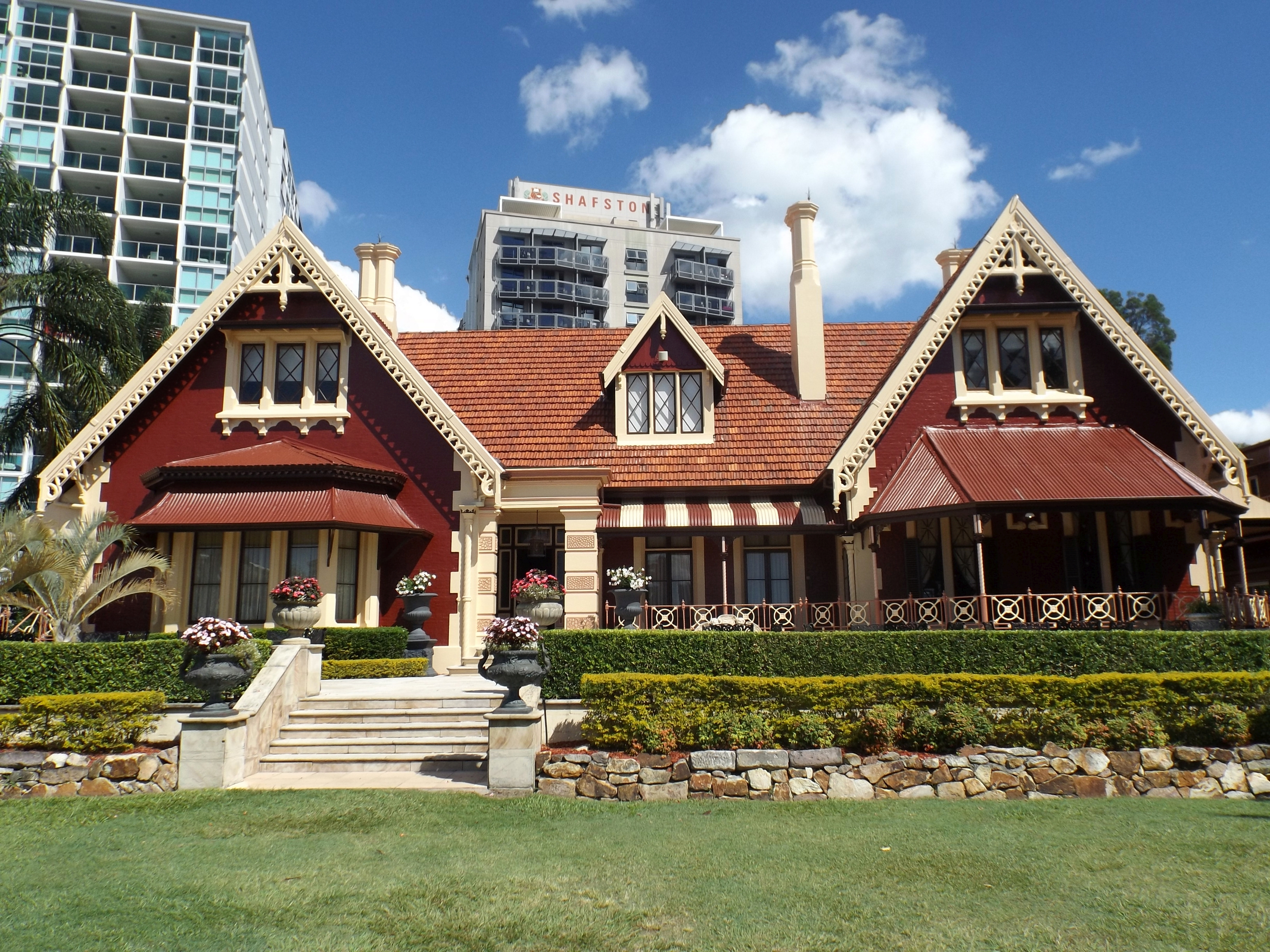
- Building in 2015

- Location within Queensland Location within Australia
- 27.4759°S 153.04°E
- Location: 23 Castlebar Street, Kangaroo Point, Queensland, Australia

History
- Design period: 1840s–1860s (mid-19th century)
- Built: 1851–1930s

Site notes
- Architect: Robin Dods

Queensland Heritage Register
- Official name: Shafston House, Anzac Hostel, Ravenscott, Shafston International College
- Type: state heritage (landscape, built)
- Designated: 7 February 2005
- Reference no.: 600241
- Significant period: 1850s–1930s (fabric); 1850s–1960s (historical)
- Significant components: ward – open air, attic, fence/wall – perimeter, driveway, residential accommodation – staff housing, lawn/s, gate – entrance, paving, residential accommodation – magistrate's house, service wing, trees/plantings, wall/s – retaining, terracing, cellar, depot – postal

Shafston House is a heritage-listed villa at 23 Castlebar Street, Kangaroo Point, Queensland, Australia. It was designed by Robin Dods and built from 1851 to 1930s. It is also known as Anzac Hostel, Ravenscott, and Shafston International College. It was added to the Queensland Heritage Register on 7 February 2005.

== History ==
Shafston House comprises a group of buildings constructed between 1851 and the 1930s, set in substantial grounds with frontage to the Brisbane River. The main house was constructed in several stages between 1851 and 1904.

The southern part of Kangaroo Point along the riverfront as far as Norman Creek was surveyed into acreage allotments by James Warner in mid-1850. The Rev. Robert Creyke (Church of England) purchased from the Crown two of these allotments (eastern suburban allotments 44 and 45) containing just over 10 acres with frontage to the Brisbane River, just within the Brisbane town boundary. A deed of grant was issued to him in November 1851. On portion 44 he constructed a single-storeyed house that he called Ravenscott. Creyke joined a number of Brisbane's early gentry and pastoralists from the hinterland who, in the 1840s and 1850s, established town estates along the Brisbane River, most of them just outside the official town boundaries. These included Newstead House (1846) near Breakfast Creek, Toogoolawah (later Bulimba House), (1849–50) across the river from Newstead, Riversdale (now Mowbray Park, early 1850s), Milton House (c. 1852 or 1853) just beyond the western town boundary and Eskgrove (1853) downstream from Shafston and Riversdale.

An 1851, sketch of Ravenscott attributed to visiting artist Conrad Martins shows a long, single-storeyed, low-set residence with verandahs and hipped roof, overlooking the Brisbane River. The grounds were mostly cleared and included outbuildings, the whole enclosed by a post and rail fence.

In December 1852, Creyke's Kangaroo Point property was transferred to Darling Downs pastoralist and politician Henry Stuart Russell, who in his memoirs states that he "completed" the house and renamed it Shafston, likely after his wife's birthplace in Jamaica. This implies that the core of Shafston House incorporates the earlier Ravenscott. Russell also purchased a number of neighbouring blocks to create a town riverine estate of over 44 acres (17.6 hectares).

In April 1854, Russell advertised Shafston for letting or sale. At this time the house, constructed of brick and stone, contained a drawing room and dining room separated by folding doors, five large bedrooms, closets and a roomy pantry. A passage 67 feet (20 m) long ran nearly the length of the house. Beneath the drawing room was a stone dairy, larder and wine-cellar 8 feet (2.4 m) high. There was a verandah 160 feet (49 m) in length. At the rear, attached via a covered way, was a brick service block, which included a large kitchen (stone flagged), two servants' bedrooms, large laundry, store rooms and offices. Off the laundry was a drying yard enclosed by a paling fence. A large brick outbuilding contained a two-stall stables, coach-house, harness room and 2 grooms' rooms, with a loft over all. Other improvements included a fowl-house, well and a garden of about 3 acres enclosed by a paling fence. The whole property, which comprised approximately 44 acres, was enclosed with a four-rail hardwood fence. Most of the improvements had been made within the previous 18 months (that is, since late 1852 when Russell had acquired the property).

Shafston did not sell in 1854 and was offered for sale again in October 1855. By this time Russell had vacated the premises and it was operating as a boarding house. The ground floor comprised 8 rooms, staircase and china closet and had hardwood joists and flooring. There was a verandah front and back, the front verandah being 56 feet (17 m) long and 10 feet (3.0 m) wide, under which there were three spacious cellars. French doors opened onto the front verandah. The dining and drawing rooms were separated by folding doors. The attic contained three rooms, two of which were large enough to make suitable bedrooms "if required". This suggests that the 5 bedrooms mentioned in the 1854 advertisement were all located on the ground floor. Attached was a kitchen, servants' rooms and pantry, with a verandah at the front. There was a substantial stable 25 by 15 feet (7.6 by 4.6 m).

Again the property did not sell. Tenants in the 1850s included Nehemiah Bartley and Brisbane solicitor Daniel Foley Roberts and his family.

A sketch of Shafston dated c. 1858 shows a substantial, single-storeyed house with a front verandah, a high-pitched roof, attic rooms and three dormer windows overlooking the Brisbane River.

Title to the estate was transferred to grazier and sugar-grower Louis Hope in October 1859. It appears that Hope did not reside at Shafston. Gilbert Eliot, Speaker of the Queensland Parliament, tenanted Shafston House from 1860 to 1871 and tenants in the 1870s included William Barker of Telemon Station and Dr and Mrs Henry Challinor.

In 1875, Hope subdivided the property and in late 1876, during William Barker's tenancy, Shafston House on just over 4 acres (1.6 hectares) of riverfront land was advertised for sale. The house contained 9 rooms on the ground floor and had changed little since 1854: a brick and stone house with a roof of hardwood shingles and iron, drawing room ("the largest and coolest to be found in any private family in this colony"), dining room, five bedrooms, closets, dressing and bath rooms, kitchen and about six servants' apartments, a large brick stable with two stalls, coach-house, man's room and hay-house and galvanised iron and underground water storage tanks. No sale was transacted at this time and in August 1881 the same advertisement was run in the Brisbane Courier.

In mid-1883 Shafston House was transferred to Mary Jane Foster, wife of Charles Milne Foster of Brisbane ironmongers Foster and Kelk. Foster had learnt the family ironmongery business in Lincoln, Yorkshire and after emigrating to Queensland he established in Brisbane with his brother-in-law the successful ironmongery firm of Foster and Kelk. The Fosters, who resided at Shafston House until 1896, reputedly remodelled the house in the early 1880s, the architect for this work thought to be former Queensland Colonial Architect, FDG Stanley. The remodelling at this period appears to have included replacing the verandahs in their present form, adding the entry portico and more elaborate and picturesque Gothic detailing. The bay windows also were probably added at this time.

In the late 1890s and early 1900s the house was occupied sequentially by tenants E. B. Bland, manager of the BISN Company; John F McMullen; and William Gray of Webster & Co.

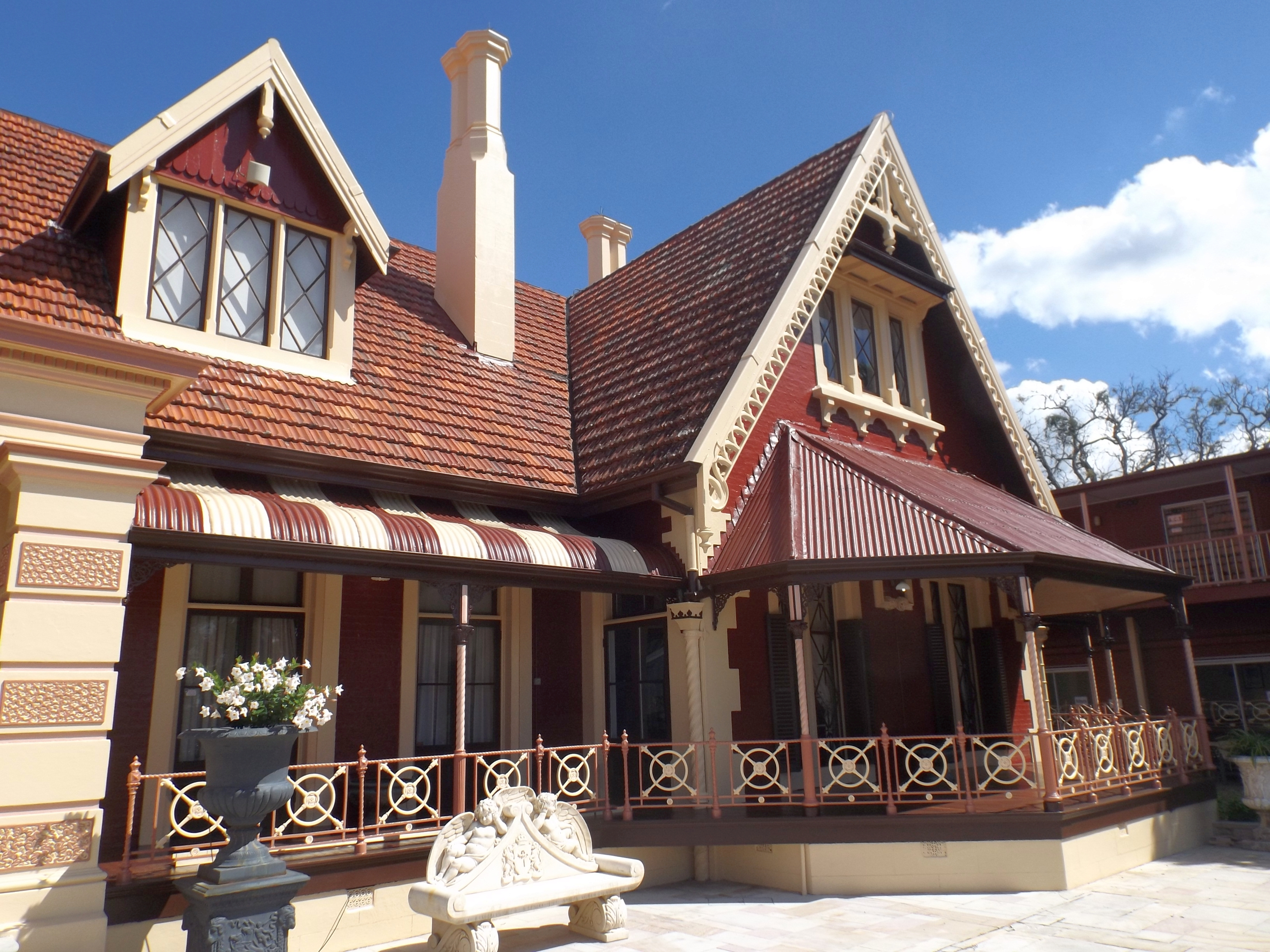
Building detail, 2015

By 1903 pastoralist James Henry McConnel of Cressbrook in the Brisbane River Valley, had occupied Shafston House as his family's town house. Title to the property was transferred to him in 1904 and in that year he commissioned noted Brisbane architect Robin Smith Dods to undertake a third renovation of the house. Dods' contribution appears to have been the elaborate timber work in the front hall and the two main public rooms (drawing and dining rooms) and likely the windows in the dormers. His work includes decorative elements like the fireplaces, timber fretwork to the entrance and the cupboard below the stair.

Shafston House remained the McConnel home until c. 1913 and in 1915 it was leased to the Creche and Kindergarten Association as a teacher training centre.

In 1919, in the aftermath of the Great War of 1914–1918, the property was acquired by the Commonwealth government and converted into an Anzac Hostel for the care and treatment of totally and permanently incapacitated ex-servicemen. Anzac Hostels were established in most Australian states at this period.

At this time the property consisted of the main house, kitchen block, stables and a bush house. The 1919 alterations were extensive. The main house initially served both hostel and administrative functions, with the former drawing room being converted into a ward, the dining room retaining its original function and the bedrooms occupied as nurses room, matron's room, etc. A study and a bedroom at the western end of the house were combined by the removal of a wall to create a recreation room. The attic level, which in 1919 was a single open space, was partitioned into bedrooms for nurses and a box room, with the landing retained as a common room. The kitchen courtyard was roofed and two new rooms were constructed in that space. A timber laundry block was constructed to the south of the kitchen and the stables were converted into orderlies' quarters.

To accommodate the returned servicemen a large open-sided ward block was erected in the terraced front grounds to the northeast of the house in 1919, connected to the house via a covered way. This single-storeyed building was high-set on stumps with an attached ablutions block on the eastern side. It demonstrated aspects of public health theory, especially the benefits of fresh air in the recuperative process and in maintaining good health, popular at the time. Theory was translated into practice in a number of government designs for public buildings such as open-sided school blocks and hospital wards in the 1910s and early 1920s.

Anzac Hostel received its first patients on 19 July 1920 and functioned as a repatriation hospital until c. 1969.

In the late 1920s and 1930s the Commonwealth subdivided and sold the southern part of the property, reducing the house grounds to just over 2 acres (0.8 hectare). At this time the early brick stables building, which was located on the subdivided land, was demolished and replaced in 1928 by a small timber building constructed to the northwest of the house as quarters for orderlies working at the hostel. This building comprised three rooms and a verandah and toilets at the rear. The 1919 laundry block was moved to a position just east of the kitchen block and a new garage was constructed in the southwest corner of the remaining grounds, near Thorn Street.

In 1937 the East Brisbane Postal Depot was constructed for the Postmaster General's Department in the southwest corner of the property, between Thorn Street and the hostel garage. It comprised a single room, 14 by 12.5 feet (4.3 by 3.8 m). A large L-shaped extension was erected in 1951, for use as a mail sorting room.

From 1969 to 1987 the property was occupied by the Royal Australian Air Force. The change in use necessitated a number of alterations to the fabric of the place, including rearrangements of offices, installation of a bar and fire-escapes, upgrading of bathroom facilities, new floor finishes, enclosure of verandahs and the enclosing of the previously open sub-floor in the main house. A garage and store were erected between the ward block and the river. Work to the grounds included new paving, new fences along the street frontages, new street entrances, new driveways, parking areas and tree planting along the Castlebar Street and southern boundaries. By 1981 the main house was used as an administrative headquarters and mess and as offices for the RAAF police; a Movement Control Centre had been established in the ward block; the headquarters of the Queensland Air Training Corps was located in the former kitchen block; the RAAF Public Relations and Photographic Section was accommodated in the garage/former postal depot; and the former orderlies building had been converted into a tavern.

In 1978 the cultural heritage significance of Shafston House was recognised by its inclusion in the Commonwealth Register of the National Estate and in the 1980s conservation work carried out on the main house.

In 1988 Shafston House was leased to a Brisbane entrepreneur under two consecutive ninety-nine year leases. After failing to gain local government approval for use of the property as a restaurant and function venue, the house was refurbished as a residence. The 1919 laundry was demolished and a new garage constructed adjacent to the early kitchen building. The ward block was refurbished, additional bathrooms installed in the house and changes were made to landscaping.

In 1994 the lease was transferred to another entrepreneur and in 1995/96 the property was redeveloped as part of the Shafston International College. The main house was refurbished, with some loss of reconstructed colour schemes, and the link to the kitchen wing enclosed with a new sitting room. Further substantial works were carried out to the grounds and other buildings in the grounds, including enclosure of the open-air ward. A concrete board walk and new retaining walls were installed on the river frontage to Brisbane City Council requirements.

The property was converted to freehold title between 1998 and 2002.

In January 2021, the house and property adjacent to the Brisbane River were sold to a property development agency, Burgundy Group Property Development, with an estimated land valuation of AUD$17.5 million.

== Description ==
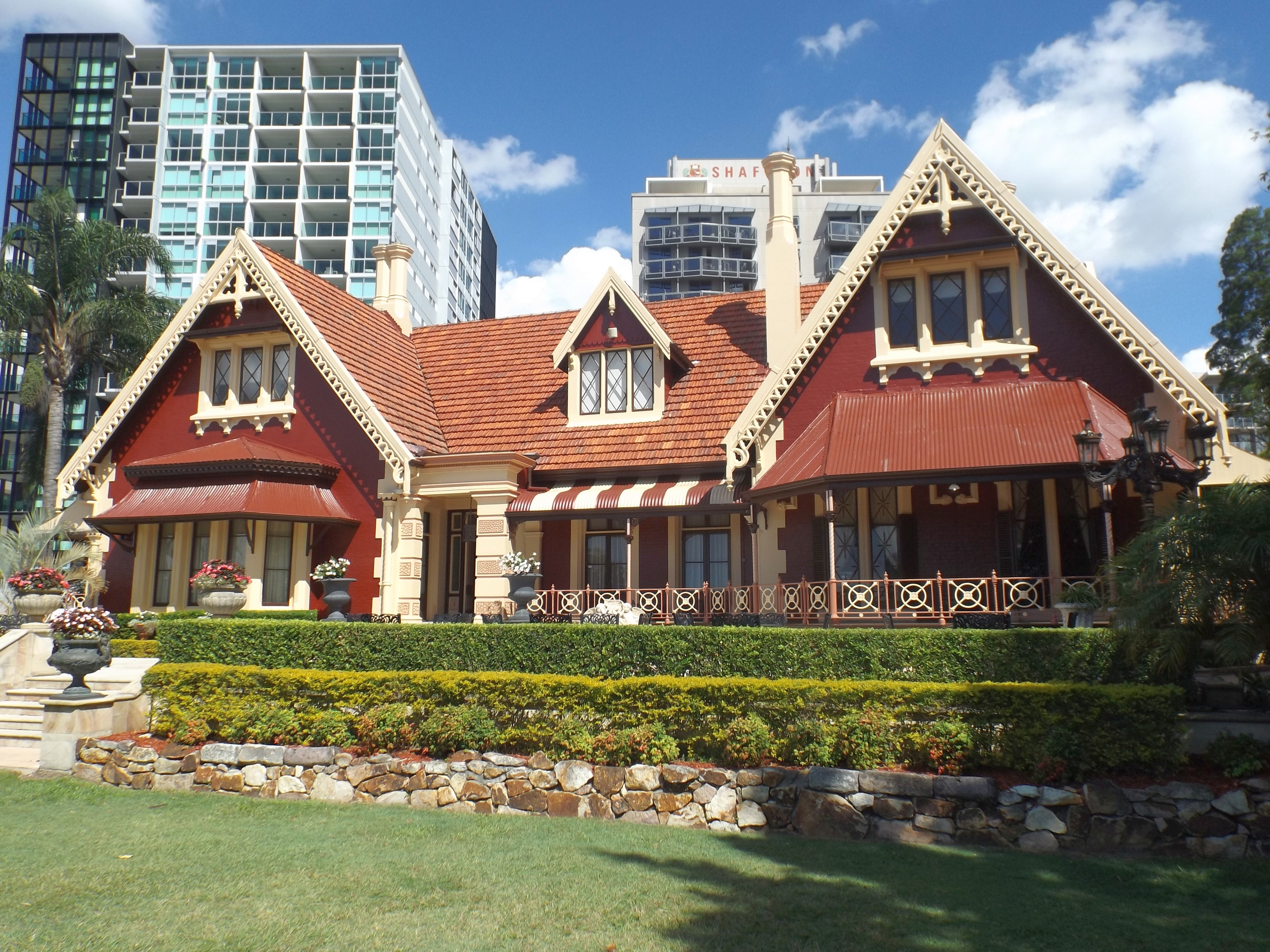
View from riverside lawn, 2015

Shafston house stands on a large site which slopes down to the Brisbane river at Kangaroo Point. Buildings include the original house and its kitchen (1851), the former ward block (1919), the former orderlies' accommodation (1928), the former postal depot (1936), a recent garage and a very recent two-storeyed adjacent to the kitchen.

The one-storey brick-and-stone residence features a highly pitched gabled roof, attic rooms and cellars. The walls rest on foundations of Brisbane tuff and the roof, once shingled and then slated, is clad with terracotta tiles. To the rear is the original detached brick service wing, also on a Brisbane tuff stone foundation.

The style is Gothic-revival, with exterior decoration including: elaborate plaster mouldings to bargeboards; timber pendants in the gables; dormers; and quoining to the projecting front gables.

The southern front projection features a bay window with corrugated iron roof and awning. At the northern end, French doors open onto a faceted balcony with a steeply pitched iron roof and cast-iron balustrading of a circle and cross-brace pattern. The main entrance is defined by a rendered masonry portico off-set to the south of the small front verandah.

Internal walls are mostly rendered brick and the floorboards are of pine. The main reception rooms feature coffered ceilings. The ornate friezes, cornices and dados in the principal rooms, which were restored in the early 1980s, are thought to date from the 1880s.

Joinery throughout is of cedar, with the early twentieth century renovations reflecting the influence of the Art Nouveau movement. The extent of RS Dods changes are not known but the fireplaces and much of the internal joinery and panelling, especially in the stairwell and doorways, are attributed to him. Dods probably added the diagonally glazed window panes in the upper windows.

A number of other structures have been erected in the grounds, the most significant of which is the large ward block constructed in 1919. This is a single-storey low-set timber building on stumps. The ward was designed as open-sided, but has since been excavated under to allow for the construction of new accommodation, enclosed and extended and substantial changes made to the immediate setting.

The fine entrance gateway from Castlebar Street with cast-iron gates and posts and adjoining cast-iron fence set on sandstone plinths and pillars survive as some of the early fencing. The form of the driveway sweeping around the front of the house from Castlebar to Thorn Street can be distinguished, but these have been paved and parking bays added. Some stone paving from the kerb to the property boundary at Castlebar Street remains.

The terraced lawn between the house and the river remains reasonably intact, but remaining areas have been much altered to provide paving and parking. Some large and mature trees on the northwest boundary survive including a fig tree near the former orderlies cottage.

Close to the river some brick and stone retaining walls of an apparently early date survive.

== Heritage listing ==
Shafston House was listed on the Queensland Heritage Register on 7 February 2005 having satisfied the following criteria.

The place is important in demonstrating the evolution or pattern of Queensland's history.

Constructed as a single-storeyed house in 1851 with significant modifications c. 1852-53, early 1880s and 1904, Shafston House is one of a small group of riverine estate residences surviving in Brisbane from the pre-separation period and is important in demonstrating the early pattern of Queensland's history. The house is situated in an elevated position and maintains strong visual links with the river looking over a large terraced lawn, the general form of which remains intact. Of the surviving 1840s and 1850s riverine houses in Brisbane, only Newstead House (1846) and Shafston House (1851) retain this relationship with the river.

The house retained its status as a gentleman's residence for over 60 years during which time it was associated with a number of prominent persons who helped shape the pattern of development of Queensland, including Rev. Robert Creyke who began construction of the house in 1851, Darling Downs pastoralist and politician Henry Stuart Russell who completed the house in 1852 in its Gothic form and named the property "Shafston", the Hon. Louis Hope who owned the property from 1859 to the early 1880s, the Foster family (of ironmongers Foster & Kelk) who reputedly remodelling the house in the early 1880s and pastoralist James Henry McConnel of Cressbrook whose family commissioned the architect RS Dods to further modify the house.

The property is significant also for its later development and function as an Anzac Hostel (1919-c. 1969) for the care and treatment of totally and permanently incapacitated ex-servicemen, illustrating the impact of the first and second world wards on Australia and how this nation dealt with that impact. It was the only Anzac Hostel in Queensland developed as a long term hostel for totally and permanently incapacitated servicemen returning from the Great War and is one of only two remaining former first world war repatriation hospitals in Queensland, the other being Rosemount at Windsor.

The place demonstrates rare, uncommon or endangered aspects of Queensland's cultural heritage.

Shafston House has rarity value as one of the earliest houses surviving in Brisbane. It is probably the third oldest house in the metropolitan area, after Newstead House (1846) and Bulimba House (1849–50) and a rare surviving remnant of a riverine estate of a type typical in the early development of Brisbane.

The place has potential to yield information that will contribute to an understanding of Queensland's history.

Evidence of the 1850s house lies within the existing structure and has potential to reveal evidence of 1850s construction methods in Queensland, which is uncommon.

The place is important in demonstrating the principal characteristics of a particular class of cultural places.

With its stone cellars, attic rooms, detached brick service block, terraced grounds and river frontage, its decorative detailing and demarcation between public and private spaces and between "family" and "servant" areas, Shafston House is important in demonstrating in its form, materials, design, layout, size and detailing the principal characteristics of its class: an evolving, substantial, mid-19th century middle-class riverine house. Since 1851 the house has retained its original siting in an estate overlooking the river, a river frontage and the visual link between the house and the river.

The main rooms, in particular the drawing room and dining room contain rare evidence of elaborate high Victorian taste with painted dados and friezes and elaborate joinery and mantlepieces. The character of the internal refurbishment by Dods also survives. The drawing room and dining room contain the best evidence of Dods internal refurbishment but also contain bay windows attributed to Stanley. Decorative elements like the fireplaces, timber fretwork to the entrance and the cupboard below the stair and upstairs details, including the dormers, have been attributed to Dods.

Several outbuildings associated with the repatriation hospital were constructed during this period, including an open-air ward (1919), garage (c. 1919) and orderlies' quarters (1928). These are important to our understanding of how the place functioned as a hospital.

The former Ward Block built in 1919 in a pavilion form demonstrates the plan typical of smaller hospitals of the time providing two wards separated by smaller rooms and is typical in its lightweight timber construction. The siting to catch breezes and enhance airflow characterises health practices that were considered important at the time.

The place is important because of its aesthetic significance.

Shafston House is an evolving house with major renovations in the 1850s, 1880s and 1900s, that has maintained a cohesive aesthetic appeal. The aesthetic significance is engendered principally by the picturesque values of the Victorian Gothic style of architecture (including the decorative detailing) and the garden layout and riverside setting. Although overlaid by the later work of the architects Stanley and Dods, the characteristics of the style remain. The verandahs and entrance porch introduced in the 1880s and the interior joinery introduced in the early 1900s make further aesthetic contributions. The place is a landmark along the Brisbane River and in views from New Farm across the river and makes a significant aesthetic contribution to the Brisbane riverscape.
