= La Trobe, East Brisbane =

Historic building in Queensland, Australia

La Trobe residence, East Brisbane
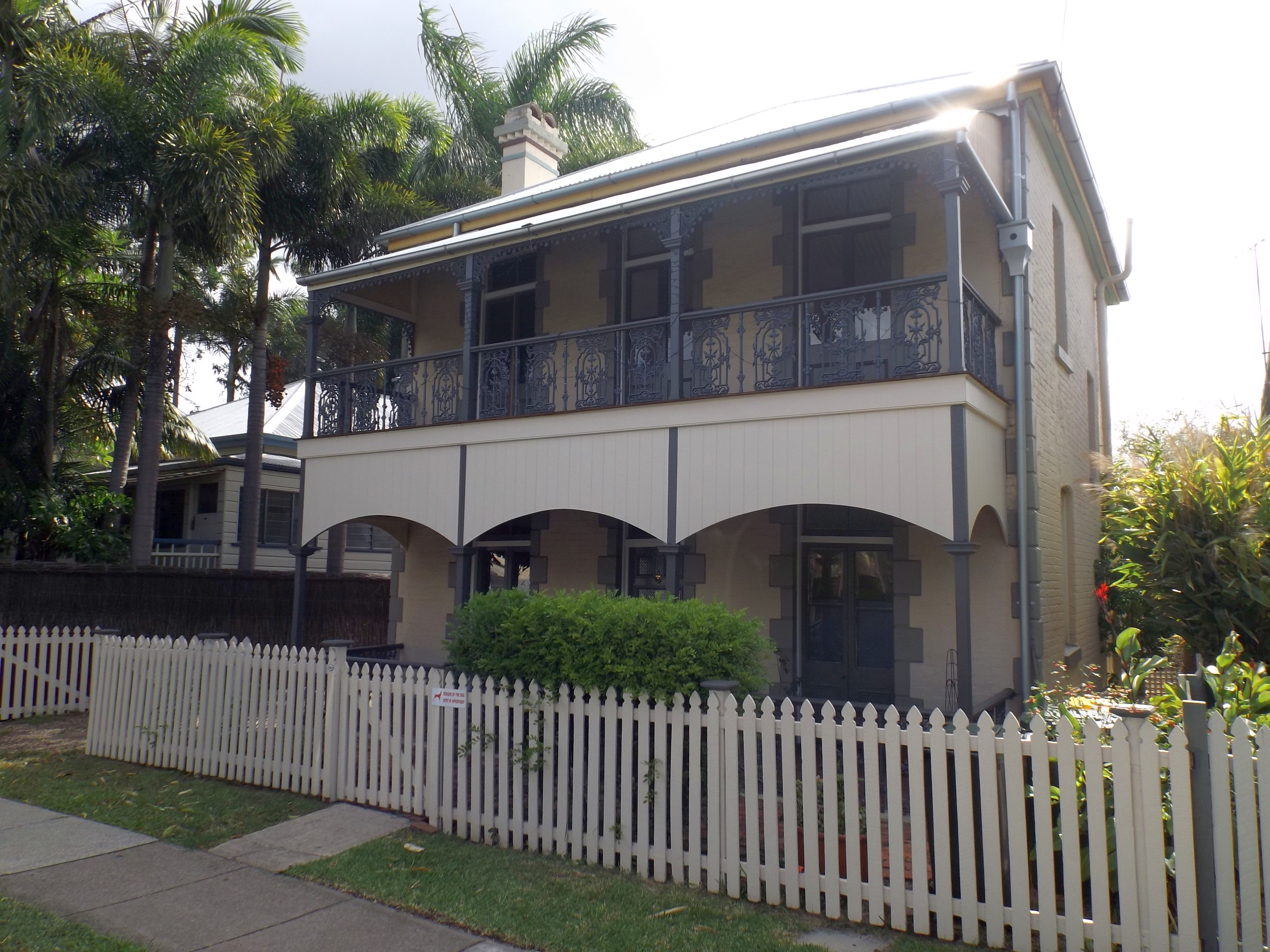
- Building in 2015

- Location within Queensland Location within Australia
- 27.4805°S 153.0435°E
- Location: 58 LaTrobe Street, East Brisbane, Queensland, Australia

History
- Design period: 1870s–1890s (late 19th century)
- Built: c. 1886
- Built for: William Henry Genn

Queensland Heritage Register
- Official name: La Trobe
- Type: state heritage (built)
- Designated: 21 October 1992
- Reference no.: 600188
- Significant period: 1880s (fabric, historical)
- Significant components: residential accommodation – main house, trees/plantings

La Trobe is a heritage-listed detached house at 58 LaTrobe Street, East Brisbane, Queensland, Australia. It was built c. 1886. It was added to the Queensland Heritage Register on 21 October 1992.

== History ==
This two-storeyed house was built c. 1886 for William Henry Genn, a plumber, iron worker and wood carver.

Latrobe Street was created along with the mid-1880s subdivision of the Mowbraytown Estate, from which East Brisbane derives much of its historical identity. The Estate was part of a substantial parcel of East Brisbane land, including what is now Mowbray Park, alienated in the 1850s by the "father" of Presbyterianism in Queensland, Rev. Thomas Mowbray. Mowbray died in 1867, and in 1884 his widow sold part of the estate to Josiah Young of Brisbane. Young immediately subdivided this land as the Mowbraytown Estate, prior to the introduction of the Undue Subdivision of Land Act 1885, which limited residential blocks to no less than 16 perches (400 m^{2}). The Mowbraytown blocks were long, narrow allotments of between 13 and 14 perches (330 and 350 m^{2}), and attracted mostly working class and lower middle class purchasers. By 1887 there were 13 houses in Latrobe Street, including Genn's house, most of which were occupied by artisans.

Unusually for Brisbane, where milled timber was the cheapest available building product, Genn's house was constructed of bricks from William Williams' brickyard at Lutwyche. Williams' bricks are identified from the frog, or imprint, of an open hand with a heart.

La Trobe most likely derived its name from its location in Latrobe Street, and was known as such by 1922. It appears to have been used mostly as a rental property, and has changed ownership many times. In the late 1940s it was converted into three flats. Subsequent alterations and conversions included the enclosing of verandahs.

New owners began refurbishment in the early 1980s. This included the opening of the verandahs with cast-iron balustrading, and a new kitchen on the site of the original.

== Description ==
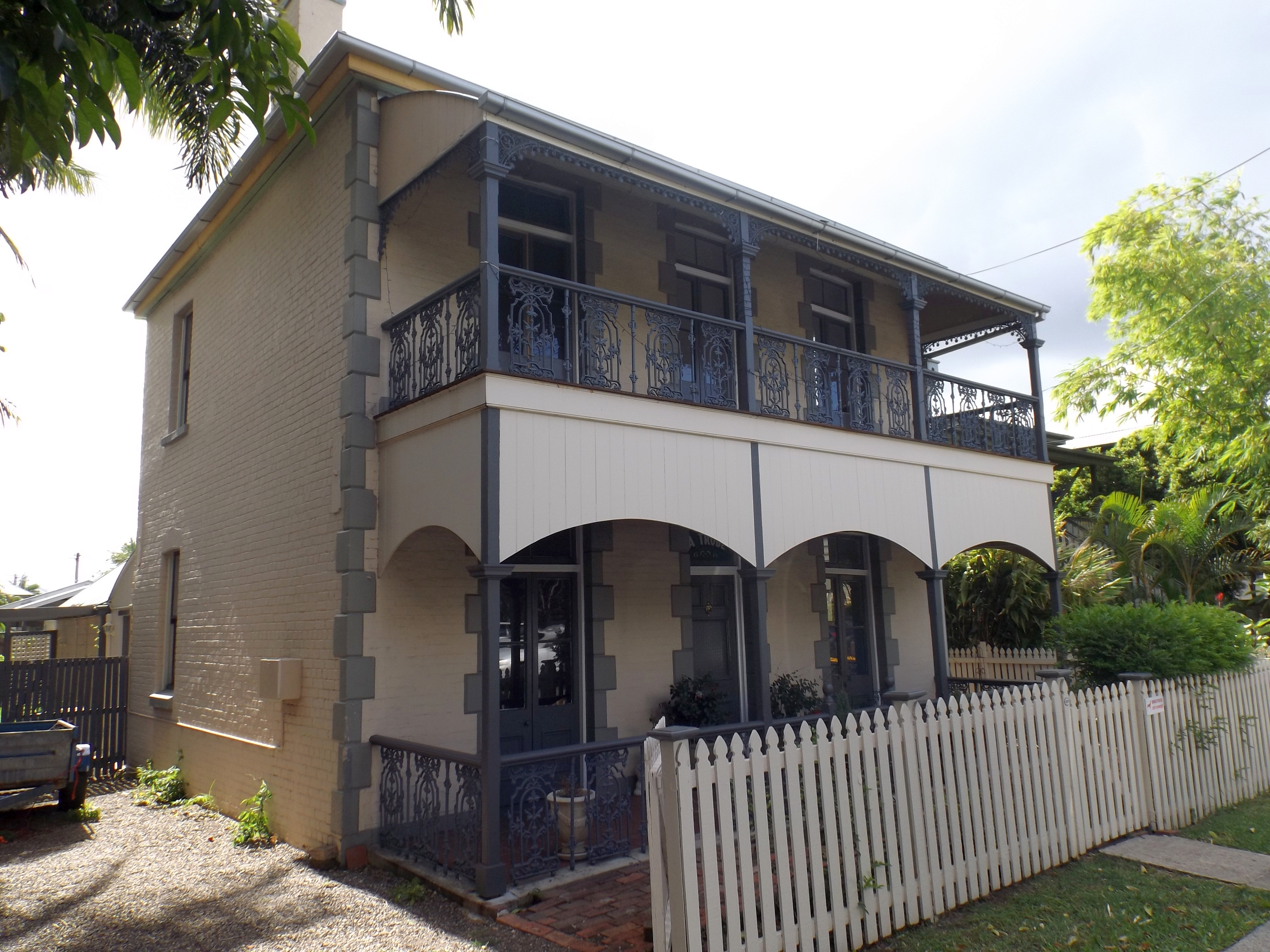
Residence in 2015

The main facade of this two-storeyed brick dwelling has a timber verandah with cast-iron balustrading, timber valance on the lower level and cast-iron fringe to the upper level. The brickwork has rendered quoins, jambs and lintels. Five pairs of French doors and the front door all have fanlights.

The internal walls are lined with tongue and groove boards. Both floors have a central passageway with one long room on the left, which includes a fireplace with cast-iron grate and timber surround. On the right are two rooms and the staircase.

The ground floor rear verandah has a convex iron roof and is enclosed. On the left hand side it provides access to the modern replacement kitchen, family room, laundry and storeroom.

Mature street trees complement this refurbished dwelling.

== Heritage listing ==
La Trobe was listed on the Queensland Heritage Register on 21 October 1992 having satisfied the following criteria.

The place is important in demonstrating the evolution or pattern of Queensland's history.

The place is important because of its aesthetic significance.

It illustrates the rapid development of East Brisbane during the boom of the 1880s, especially following the subdivision of the Mowbraytown Estate c. 1884, and makes an important contribution to the historical character of East Brisbane and to the Latrobe Street streetscape.

The place demonstrates rare, uncommon or endangered aspects of Queensland's cultural heritage.

The place is important in demonstrating the principal characteristics of a particular class of cultural places.

La Trobe, erected c. 1886, is a fine example of a small, two-storeyed, 1880s brick dwelling, which is uncommon in Brisbane.
