= Thorpe Allen =

Australian cricketer

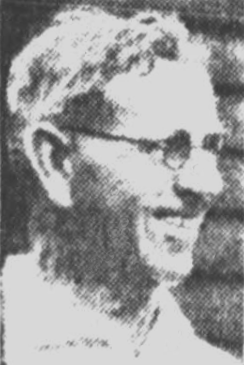

Personal information
- Born: 7 March 1870; Oxley, Queensland
- Died: 25 January 1950 (aged 79); East Brisbane, Queensland, Australia

Domestic team information
- Years: Team
- Queensland

Career statistics
Competition	FC
Matches	1
Runs scored	6
Batting average	3.00
100s/50s	0/0
Top score	6
Balls bowled	–
Wickets	0
Bowling average	–
5 wickets in innings	–
10 wickets in match	–
Best bowling	–
Catches/stumpings	0/0
- Source: ESPNcricinfo, 20 December 2017

Thorpe Allen (7 March 1870 – 25 January 1950) was an Australian cricketer who played one First-class match for Queensland in January 1899.

Allen joined the Colonial Mutual Fire Insurance Company as an office boy in 1886, retiring almost fifty years later in 1935 as a manager.

From the 1920s, Allen was a keen bowls player, serving as a secretary of the East Brisbane club. He collapsed and died on 25 January 1950 while bowling in East Brisbane.
