= Triumph Cinema =

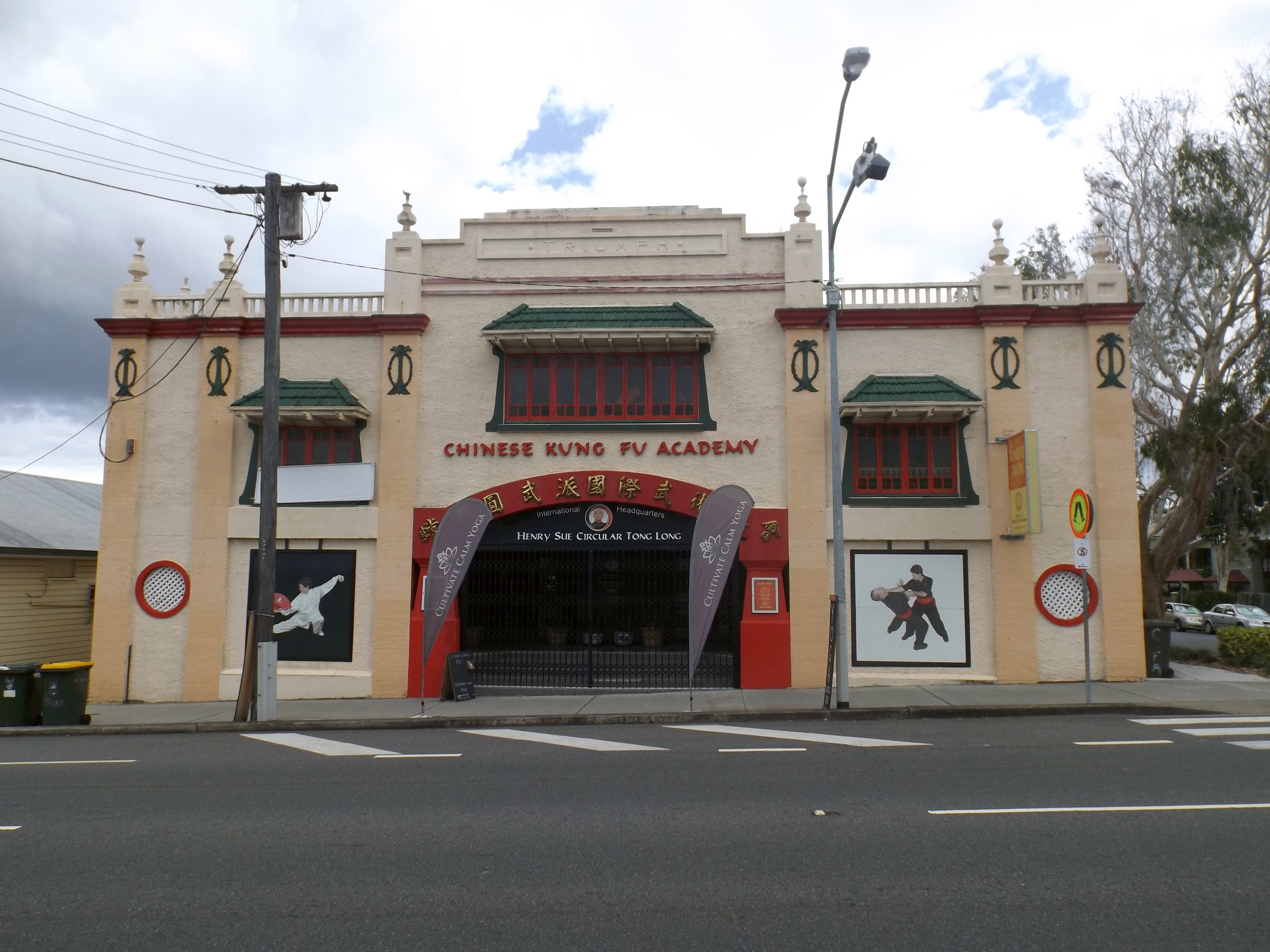
- Front of building, 2015

- Location within Queensland Location within Australia
- 27.4884°S 153.0466°E
- Location: 963 Stanley Street, East Brisbane, City of Brisbane, Queensland, Australia

History
- Design period: 1919–1930s (interwar period)
- Built: 1927

Site notes
- Architect: Arthur Robson
- Architectural style: Mediterranean

Queensland Heritage Register
- Official name: Classic Cinema, East Brisbane Picture Theatre, Elite Cinema, Triumph Cinema
- Type: state heritage (built)
- Designated: 27 July 2001
- Reference no.: 602214
- Significant period: 1927 (fabric), 1927–2000 (historical, social)
- Significant components: proscenium arch, projection booth/bio box, foyer – entrance, auditorium, stage/sound shell

Triumph Cinema, also known as Classic Cinema, East Brisbane Picture Theatre, and Elite Cinema, is a heritage-listed former cinema at 963 Stanley Street, East Brisbane, City of Brisbane, Queensland, Australia. It was designed by Arthur Robson and built in 1927. It is also known as East Brisbane Picture Theatre, Elite Cinema, and Classic Cinema. It was added to the Queensland Heritage Register on 27 July 2001.

== History ==
The site of the Triumph Cinema, East Brisbane, has been associated with film exhibition since 1921. The building itself dates to 1927, with minor modifications probably c. 1970.

The site was earlier part of a much larger parcel of land purchased from the Crown in 1855 by Joseph Darragh of Brisbane. Darragh held the land, unsubdivided, for nearly 30 years, and it was the eventual subdivision of this property into residential allotments (mostly 16 perches) in the mid-1880s, which established East Brisbane as a dormitory suburb. Prior to this, East Brisbane was semi-rural in character, with a few isolated families scattered through the bush, and a number of elite estates (such as Mowbray's and Heath's) along the riverbank.

In June 1885 Annie Elizabeth Cocks gained title to subdivisions 112 and 113 of eastern allotment 128, parish of South Brisbane, county of Stanley (32 perches - later the site of the picture theatre). Cocks owned this land for over 20 years. About 1906 she sold it to Brisbane real estate agent George Henry Blocksidge, who in 1907 transferred the property to Henry William Robinson, who established a fuel depot there.

On 1 July 1921 the property was transferred from Robinson to Frederick Carl Christian Olsen, who established an open-air picture show on the site that year. A sewerage detail plan dated 1919 shows a picture theatre, partly roofed, occupying the whole of the site. The date may be misleading. It is not unusual for alterations to be made to original detail plans, and in this instance, the theatre as shown on the site is more likely to date to between 1921 and 1927. Oral history reveals that the facade of this theatre was timber, and that about one-third of the seating area was roofed in flat galvanised iron, which on rainy days could be manually extended over about half the seating. The Olsens reputedly were very proud of this technological feat. Around the perimeter of the site were fences of flat iron.

Frederick Olsen died in January 1926. The Stanley Street East property passed to his widow, Maria Gustava Olsen, a year later, and then to Vigo Gustav Olsen (her son) in June 1927. Around the same time Vigo Olsen raised a mortgage on the property from Ernest Adolph Burmester, which is likely to have financed the construction of a new picture theatre to cost £2,000, for which Vigo Olsen already had permission from the Brisbane City Council to erect. Olsen, who lived nearby at Didsbury Street, East Brisbane, had let the contract to construct the theatre to Corinda contractor and architect Arthur Robson. It is highly likely Robson also prepared the design. He had worked for the Workers' Dwellings Board in Townsville as an inspector and as an architect in Rockhampton in the early 1920s. From 1923 he was resident in Corinda and practised as an architect and builder in Brisbane and other centres throughout Queensland. Robson both constructed and/or designed picture theatres throughout Queensland in the 1920s, including the Indooroopilly Picture Theatre (later the El Dorado), and the Paragon Theatre at Childers. By August 1928, he had erected 23 picture theatres in Queensland.

The picture theatre at Stanley Street East is listed as the Triumph in 1927 licensing records, but there is some suggestion that the place was known initially as the East Brisbane Picture Theatre. It is possible that the name was changed when the new picture theatre was built in 1927, and this is the name which still appears in relief on the facade of the building.

Vigo Olsen died in August 1929, and the property passed to his widow, Ida Elizabeth Olsen, in April 1931. Around this time she raised a further mortgage on the property from EA Burmester, possibly to purchase sound equipment for the theatre. Sound movies were introduced in 1927 with Warner Brothers' production of The Jazz Singer, and over the next few years motion picture exhibitors either converted their theatres to sound or went out of business, as demand for the "talkies" swept the world.

In mid-1934 title to the property was transferred to accountant Albert Frederick Stoddart of East Brisbane, and Alma Jones, wife of Sylvester Stephen Jones of Mount Gravatt, as tenants in common. The Jones were related to the Olsens. Gordon Jones took over the management of the Triumph in 1934, when he was only 17 years old. In 1943, AF Stoddart transferred his interest in the property to Gordon, who managed the theatre until c. 1970, exhibiting (from at least 1938, and likely earlier) as the Triumph Theatre Company.

A 1940 photograph of the theatre shows a facade remarkably similar to that which survives today. The foyer was reached via concrete steps from the street, but had not yet been enclosed with glass doors. Folding iron gates still secured the foyer, and these were at the front of the building, on the footpath. The interior of the foyer was lined with fibrous sheeting and dark-stained timber cover-strips; there was a centrally located ticket-box at the back of the foyer; and doors to the auditorium were located either side of the ticket box. The terrazzo flooring in the present entrance is likely to date to 1927.

In the 1930s, there were approximately 200 picture theatres operating in Queensland, of which about 25% were located in Brisbane. This was the period when most Brisbane suburbs had at least one picture theatre, if not more, and encouraged local allegiances. Theatre staff – owners, management and other employees (such as projectionists, organ or piano players, ticket sellers and ushers) – generally lived in the district, and the theatre offered a local community focus and sense of local identity. Competition for audiences was strong. The Triumph's closest contemporary competitors were the Broadway at the Woolloongabba Fiveways; the Mowbray Park Picture Theatre on Shafston Road; the Alhambra at Stones Corner; the Roxy (Gaiety) at Coorparoo; and the Norman Park Picture Theatre near the Norman Park railway station. Of these, only the Triumph survives.

Following the introduction of television to Brisbane in the late 1950s, Brisbane cinema audiences declined rapidly. Suburban cinemas struggled to continue screening films and in the 1960s and 1970s many closed, the buildings converted into alternative uses or the sites redeveloped. By the 1980s, only a handful of single-screen interwar suburban cinemas survived in Brisbane.

In 1960–61 the Triumph had a seating capacity of 800, suggesting that some seating refurbishment had occurred since 1938, when the theatre seated 950.

By January 1970 the property had been acquired by Roy Arthur Chesterman and Merle Audrey Chesterman, and was transferred in February 1970 to Eric Dare, who owned the place for over three decades. The changes in ownership c. 1970 correspond with a transformation of the theatre. By 1970 the Triumph had been renamed the Capri East Brisbane and was operated by the Capri Theatre Company, which screened mostly R-rated sex films. In 1971 the capacity of the theatre was listed as 510, indicating that seating and/or possibly foyer refurbishment had taken place.

The cinema is believed to have closed for a short period in the 1980s, but by 1988 had re-opened as the Classic Cinema, an art-house screening alternative and revival films, and the venue for film festivals and the annual Brisbane screening of Australian Film, Television and Radio School productions. The theatre functioned as an art-house until closed in mid-2000.

In 2014 the building was being used as a martial arts studio, with a yoga studio on the upper floor.

== Description ==
The former Triumph Cinema occupies a site at the southeast corner of Stanley Street East and Withington Street, East Brisbane. The facade fronts Stanley Street East, which is a major arterial road. The surrounding streets are mostly residential, but there is a small commercial node either side of Stanley Street East, where the cinema is located. Diagonally opposite, on the northeast corner of Stanley Street East and Didsbury Street, is the East Brisbane Hotel, erected in 1889.

The theatre is built to the street alignments and occupies the whole of the site. The front facade is two storeys in height, of rendered brick, and decorative, with strong streetscape presence. In an extraordinarily eclectic metaphorical mix typical of 1920s picture theatre architecture, the facade combines a mix of "Classical" and "Mediterranean" decorative and design elements. There are five bays, not of equal width, defined by pilasters, at the top of which are decorative concrete urns. A balustraded concrete pediment unites the two bays either side of the central bay. This middle bay is wider and taller, with a high pediment with the name TRIUMPH in rendered block lettering. Below the theatre name is a cantilevered tiled window hood above a bank of five-paned casement windows with opaque, green and amber Arctic glass. Behind these windows is the original bio-box. In the bays either side are pairs of similar casement windows, with similar window hoods above. At street level there is a centrally placed wide, low-arched entrance, defined by half pillars on each side, with concrete steps leading to what was formerly a semi-open foyer. This has been partly enclosed with later timber-framed glass doors, recessed from the arch entrance. To either side of this arched entrance is a billboard case, and in the end bays are small "porthole" windows with a square leadlight panel in each, now enclosed with timber lattice.

As was typical of suburban picture theatre construction of this period, the masonry facade returns along the sides only one narrow bay in depth. What the elegant facade was intended to obscure is that the main part of the structure, housing the auditorium, is a large, timber-framed space with a steep, gabled, galvanised iron roof. The side walls of the auditorium are clad externally with later cement sheeting. At the rear (southern) end of the main building the gable is in-filled with weatherboards and there is a lower, hipped roof extension over the stage area.

The main change to the building is that the foyer has been expanded and pushed back into the auditorium, c. 1970s. This space has a low, false ceiling of acoustic tiles, and the floor, which was formerly raked and part of the auditorium, has been raised and levelled. A ticket box and candy-bar are located on the western side of the foyer, and there are toilets on the eastern side. The auditorium is accessed from doorways at either side of the rear wall of the foyer. Above the renovated foyer is the projection booth, which is the original bio-box, accessed from steep, narrow timber stairs behind the ticket box on the western side, and near the men's toilets on the eastern side.

The auditorium remains remarkably intact and retains much of its early decorative finishes. It is a large space, with the roof supported by unboxed laminated timber arches, and has an early lattice ceiling with hessian or canvas backing which follows the curve of the arches. There are three decorative light panels in the centre of this ceiling. There is a raked timber floor, sloped more steeply at the northern end of the building. The side walls are lined internally with vertically jointed tongue and groove timber boards to dado height, and above this have early plasterboard panels with decorative "classical" mouldings between the timber arches.

There is a small stage the southern end of the auditorium, with a proscenium arch in plasterwork with "classical" motifs. On either side of the stage, angled to direct focus to the rear wall, are large, early plasterboard panels with decorative "classical" mouldings. The rear wall is constructed of galvanised iron sheeting, on which is painted an early "screen". A later cinema screen which once filled the proscenium arch has been removed. There are two early sound horns which hang above the stage. There is off-stage space either side of the stage, which suggests that it may have been used for performance purposes as well.

== Heritage listing ==
Triumph Cinema was listed on the Queensland Heritage Register on 27 July 2001 having satisfied the following criteria.

The place is important in demonstrating the evolution or pattern of Queensland's history.

The former Classic Cinema, East Brisbane, constructed in 1927 as the Triumph Theatre, a suburban family cinema, is important in illustrating the pattern of Queensland's history. The site has been associated with film exhibition - arguably the most significant form of 20th century popular culture/entertainment - since 1921, and until its closure in mid 2000, was amongst the longest operating of Queensland's picture theatres. The place is important in illustrating the nature of Queensland film exhibition, in particular the contribution of family-owned enterprises to this industry.

The place demonstrates rare, uncommon or endangered aspects of Queensland's cultural heritage.

The former Classic Cinema is a rare, substantially intact, surviving 1920s Queensland picture theatre, and one of only three substantially intact, single-auditorium, interwar picture theatres remaining in Brisbane (the others being the Dawn (1928) at Chermside and the Gaythorne (1938–39) at Gaythorne). Of these, the Classic is the earliest and most ornate. In particular it retains a remarkably intact and highly decorative 1927 facade of "classic" picture theatre design now rare in Queensland.

The place is important in demonstrating the principal characteristics of a particular class of cultural places.

The place is, and always was, a very fine example of the 1920s suburban 'picture palace': a large auditorium built to a modest budget, with a more glamorous street facade to attract patrons, and remains important in illustrating the principal characteristics of this class of building and of this genre of picture theatre design. These characteristics include: an imposing facade incorporating an eclectic mix of "Classical" and "Mediterranean" decorative and design elements, in substantial materials, in a deliberate attempt to impress and create streetscape and townscape presence; a large, gable-roofed, single-span auditorium supported by laminated timber arches; a central arched entrance; a bio-box located above the entrance; early lattice ceiling to the auditorium interior; a raked timber floor; decorative plasterboard panelling along the auditorium walls; a decorative proscenium arch; a small performance stage with decorative plasterboard panels either side; and a "screen" painted onto the sheet metal rear wall. The aesthetic hierarchy of materials and details established between facade and main structure is particularly illustrative of this type of building. The place is important also in illustrating the principal characteristics of the work of Brisbane architect/builder Arthur Robson, who specialised in theatre construction and erected and/or designed dozens of suburban and regional theatres in Queensland in the interwar period.

The place is important because of its aesthetic significance.

The place has aesthetic value engendered by the well-proportioned decorative facade, the building's imposing presence in a suburban landscape; and the imposing space of the large arched auditorium with its decorative wall finishes, proscenium arch and lattice ceiling.

The place has a strong or special association with a particular community or cultural group for social, cultural or spiritual reasons.

The place has been identified with the townscape and social character of East Brisbane since the 1920s; in the past has generated a strong sense of community focus, being a venue for local social activity and popular culture since 1921; and for well over a decade in recent years was associated with Brisbane's art-house movie circuit, being well known to thousands of Queensland "film-buffs", and the venue for film festivals and screenings of film-school productions.
