= Rueckert =

Rueckert is a surname. Notable people with the surname include:

- Daniel Rueckert (born 1969), UK-based computer scientist
- Veronica Rueckert, American writer, voice consultant, and former radio host

== See also ==
- Ruckert, another surname
- Rückert, another surname
