= Ruckert =

Ruckert is a surname. Notable people with the surname include:

- Jeremy Ruckert (born 2000), American football player
- Paul F. Ruckert (1913–2006), Australian film producer and cinematographer

== See also ==
- Rückert, another surname
- Rueckert, another surname
