= Hester Villa =

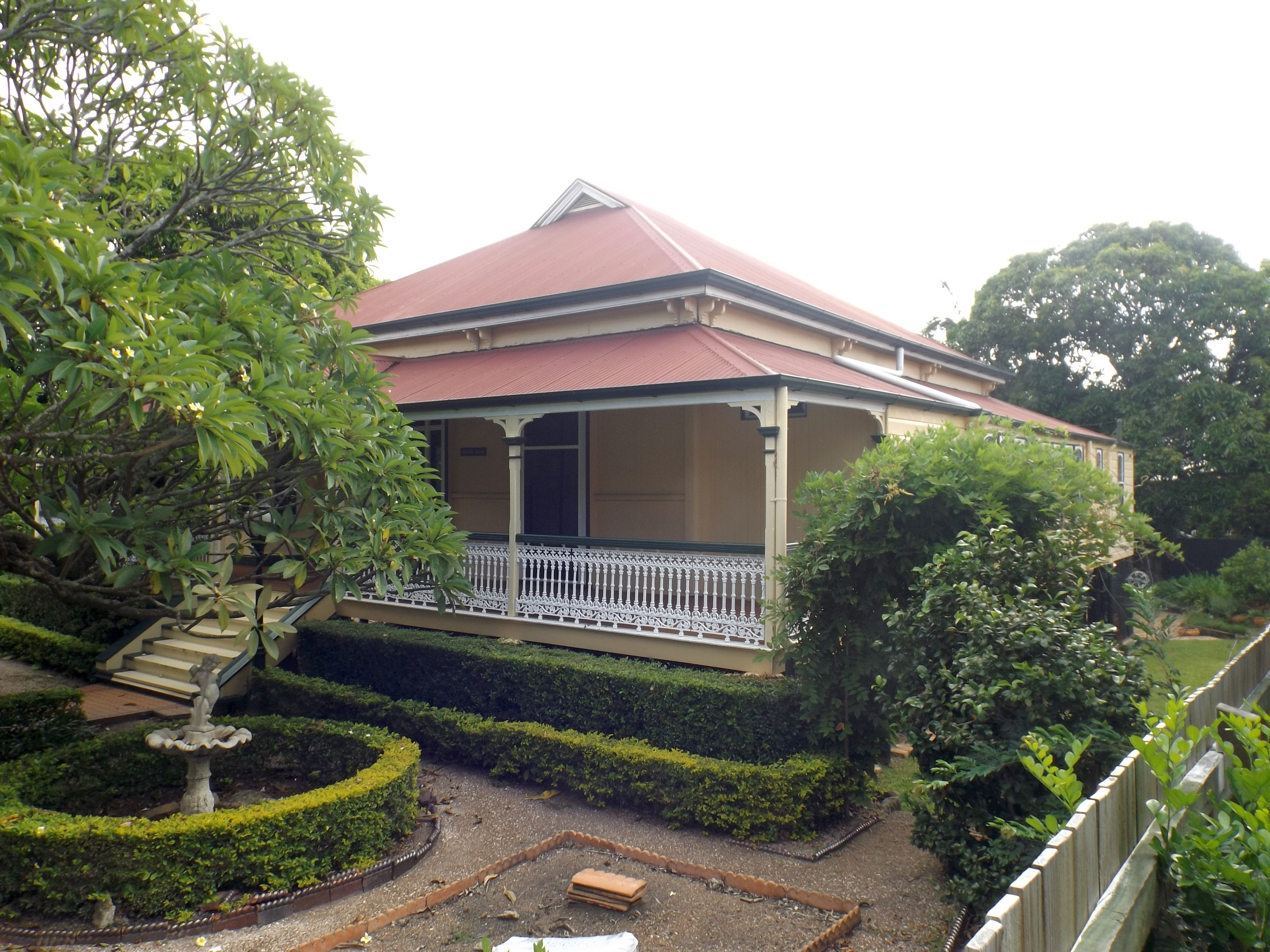
- Residence and gardens, 2015

- Location within Queensland Location within Australia
- 27.4806°S 153.0444°E
- Location: 58 Stafford Street, East Brisbane, Queensland, Australia

History
- Design period: 1900–1914 (early 20th century)
- Built: c. 1901
- Built for: Robert Pearn

Queensland Heritage Register
- Official name: Hester Villa
- Type: state heritage (built)
- Designated: 21 October 1992
- Reference no.: 600190
- Significant period: early 1900s (fabric, historical)
- Significant components: residential accommodation – main house, garden/grounds

Hester Villa is a heritage-listed detached house at 58 Stafford Street, East Brisbane, Queensland, Australia. It was built c. 1901. It was added to the Queensland Heritage Register on 21 October 1992.

== History ==
Hester Villa is a single-storey dwelling that was built about 1901 for Captain Robert Pearn. A penny nailed above the front doorway records the date. The house replaced the original family home which had burnt down.

Pearn was a master mariner who at one stage was involved with the recruiting of Pacific Islanders. After his death in 1910, his wife Louisa inherited the house. It remained the Pearn family home until 1968.

In the late 1970s the house was in a very dilapidated condition. It was acquired by conservation architect Ray Oliver and his wife, and has been sympathetically refurbished.

== Description ==
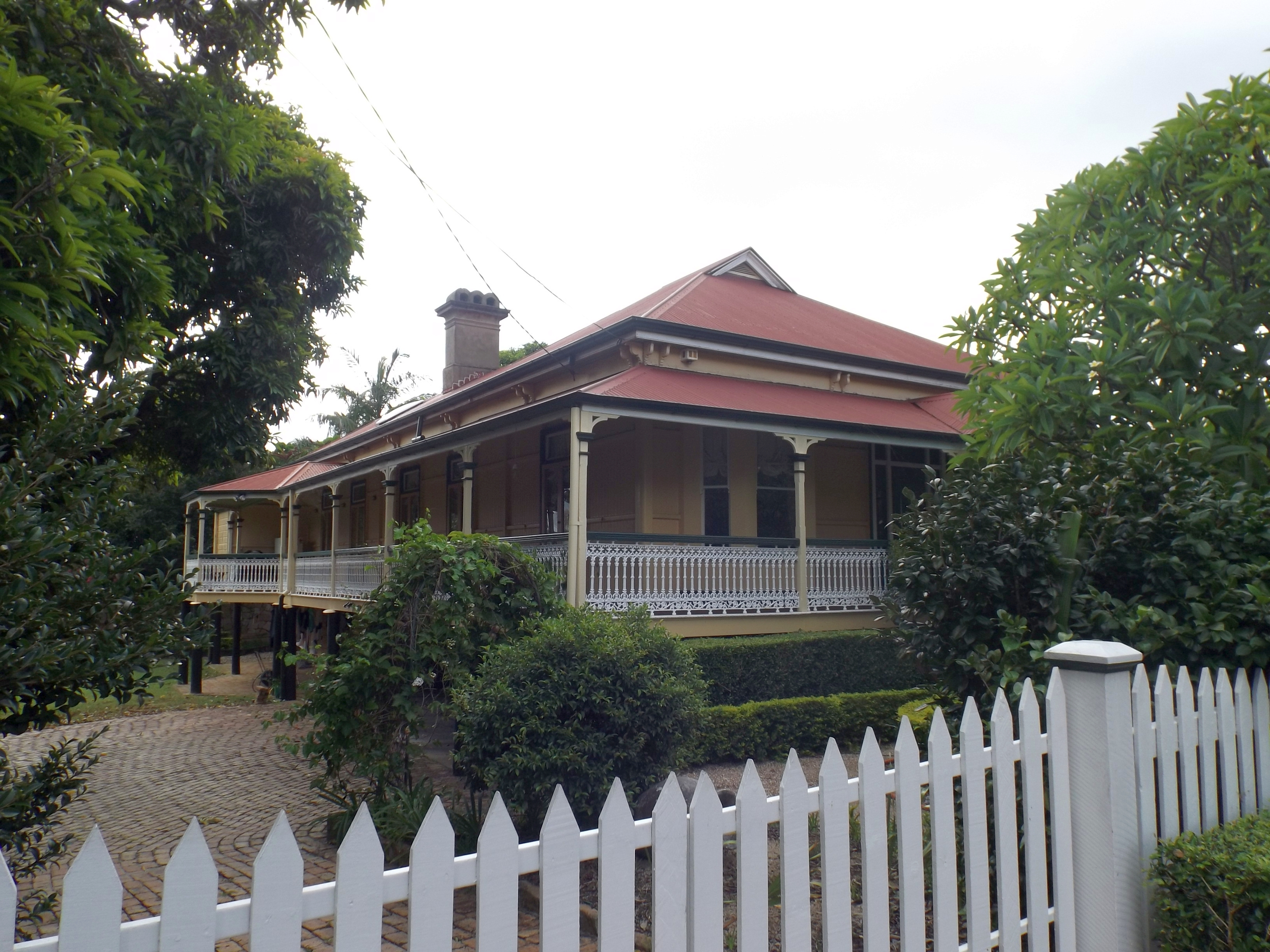
Villa and driveway, 2015

Hester Villa is a timber and corrugated iron dwelling built about 1901. It occupies three blocks in an area of medium-density housing.

The dwelling is supported by timber stumps but the sub-floor is enclosed at the back. It has a stepped verandah on three sides, a short ridge tin roof supported by twin eaves brackets and a ventilator gablet. The front facade features one bay window, ornate cast-iron balustrading, timber columns with capitals and brackets, and twin posts which support a fretwork pediment.

The four panel front door is enhanced by ruby flashed glass sidelights and provides ingress to the central corridor. Walls are lined with tongue and groove boards while step-out sash windows allow access to the verandah.

The house and garden have been sensitively rehabilitated.

== Heritage listing ==
Hester Villa was listed on the Queensland Heritage Register on 21 October 1992 having satisfied the following criteria.

The place is important in demonstrating the evolution or pattern of Queensland's history.

Hester Villa is a valuable reflection of middling status family housing in suburban Brisbane.

The place is important in demonstrating the principal characteristics of a particular class of cultural places.

Hester Villa is a fine example of a timber and iron house of the Federation period.

The place is important because of its aesthetic significance.

Hester Villa is a fine example of a timber and iron house of the Federation period.
