= Rückert =

Rückert is a surname. Notable people with the surname include:

- Ernst Rückert (1886–1945), German stage and film actor
- Feodor Rückert (1840–1917), silversmith, goldsmith, and Fabergé workmaster of German origin
- Friedrich Rückert (1788–1866), German poet, translator, and professor of Oriental languages
- Friedrich Rückert (field hockey) (1920–2011), Austrian field hockey player.
- Heinrich Rückert (1823–1875), German historian and Germanist
- Heinz Rückert (1904–1984), German opera director
- Hilda Rückert (1897–1960), German ice skater
- Jochen Rückert (born 1975), German-American jazz drummer

== See also ==
- Ruckert, another surname
- Rueckert, another surname
