= Mowbraytown Presbyterian Church =

Mowbraytown Presbyterian Church (former)
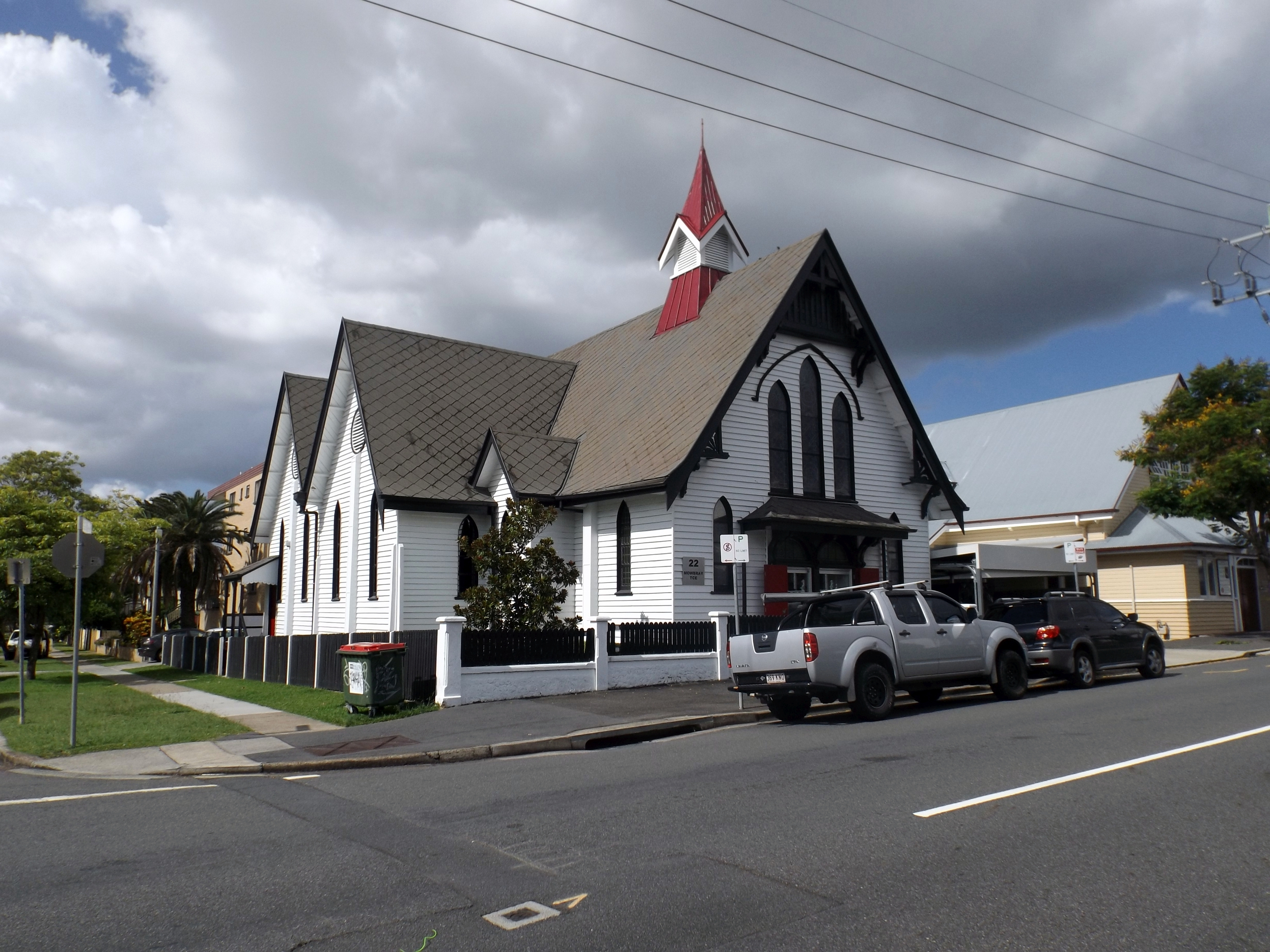
- The former church building in 2015
- Mowbraytown Presbyterian Church (former)
- 27°28′59″S 153°02′34″E
- Address: 22–28 Mowbray Terrace, East Brisbane, City of Brisbane, Queensland
- Country: Australia
- Previous denomination: Presbyterian (1885–1977); Uniting (1977–1992)

History
- Former name: East Brisbane Presbyterian Church
- Status: Church (former)
- Founder: Rev. Thomas Mowbray Williamina Mowbray
- Dedicated: 22 November 1885

Architecture
- Functional status: Church closed and sold
- Architect: Alexander Brown Wilson
- Architectural type: Church (former)
- Years built: 1885 – c. 1916
- Construction cost: £600
- Closed: December 1992

Specifications
- Materials: Timber

Queensland Heritage Register
- Official name: Mowbraytown Presbyterian Church Group, East Brisbane Presbyterian Church
- Type: State heritage (built)
- Designated: 22 October 1993
- Reference no.: 601219
- Significant period: 1880s (historical); 1880s–1900s (fabric)
- Significant components: Views to, furniture/fittings, church hall/sunday school hall, tower, apse, church, kindergarten, stained glass window/s, memorial – honour board/ roll of honour, roof/ridge ventilator/s / fleche/s

The Mowbraytown Presbyterian Church is a heritage-listed former Presbyterian and Uniting church and associated precinct at 22–28 Mowbray Terrace, East Brisbane, City of Brisbane, Queensland, Australia. The former church was designed by Alexander Brown Wilson and built from 1885 to c. 1916. The former church was also known as East Brisbane Presbyterian Church. The building was added to the Queensland Heritage Register on 22 October 1993.

The church closed in December 1992 and was sold in 1995. The building is now used as commercial office space.

== History ==
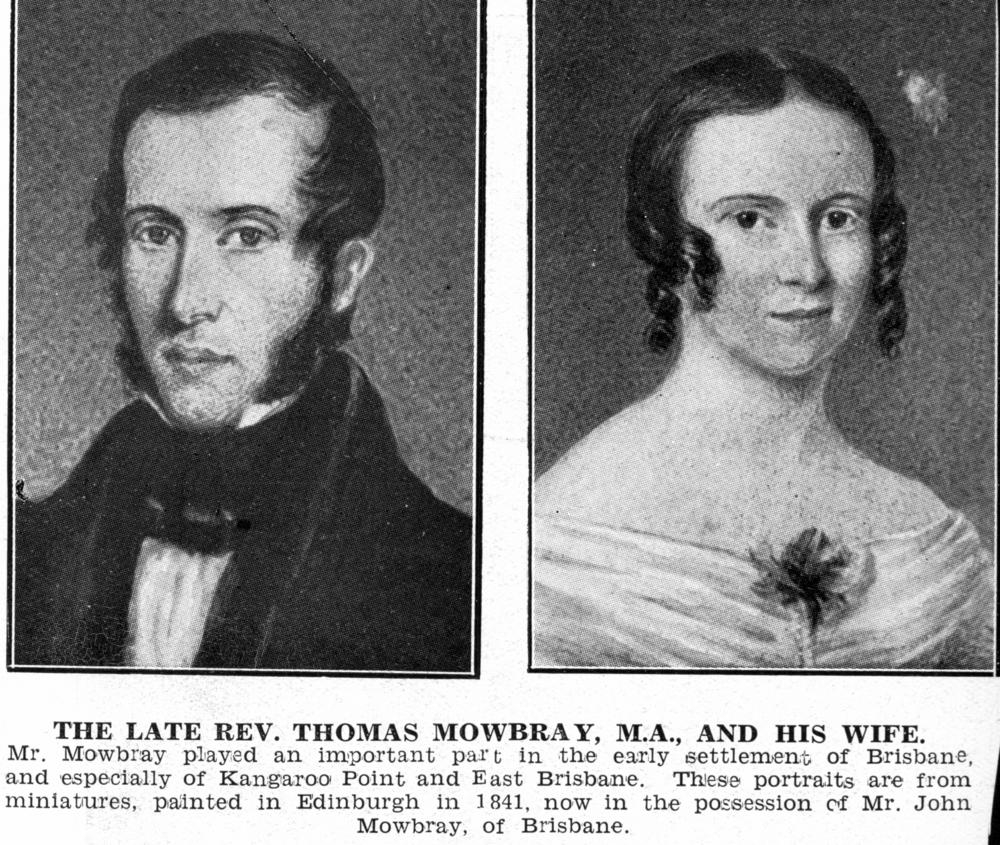
Reverend Thomas Mowbray and his wife Williamina Mowbray, 1841

The former Mowbraytown Presbyterian Church was erected in late 1885 on land donated by Williamina Mowbray, widow of the "father" of Presbyterianism in Queensland, Rev. Thomas Mowbray. In 1851, Mowbray was instrumental in establishing at Grey Street, South Brisbane, Queensland's first Presbyterian church. This building has been demolished, but his name and work is commemorated in the Mowbraytown Presbyterian Church.

In the 1850s, Mowbray acquired a substantial parcel of land, including what is now Mowbray Park and parts of East Brisbane, at what was then referred to as Kangaroo Point. In 1884 Mrs Mowbray sold part of the estate to Josiah Young of Brisbane. Young immediately subdivided this land as the Mowbraytown Estate, from which East Brisbane derives much of its identity. In 1885 Mrs Mowbray re-acquired from Young two allotments at the corner of Geelong Street and Mowbray Terrace, which she then donated to the church.

The rapid development of the East Brisbane area during the 1880s prompted the establishment of a Charge in Mowbraytown. Mowbraytown was unusual also in that it emerged almost immediately as an established and self-sustaining charge. The first service was conducted on 22 November 1885 and a minister was appointed permanently in March 1886.

The Mowbraytown former church was designed by newly established Brisbane architect Alexander Brown Wilson - later an elder of the congregation - and was erected by South Brisbane carpenter and contractor Thomas Gillies at a cost of £600, inclusive of seats and fencing. When completed in November 1885, the body of the former church measured 9.5 by 8.2 metres (31 by 27 ft), and seated 230 persons. The building was entered via two porches either side of the front gable, and the roof was shingled. The windows opened on pivots, and those in the gabled ends had leadlight borders. The bell, sent from Scotland, was erected in January 1886.

In 1888 a small Sunday school hall, which later became a kindergarten, was built at the rear of the former church. The northern half of the former church transepts was added in 1899. In 1902 a pipe organ was installed, to which an electric blower was added in 1925.

In 1909, major alterations to the Mowbraytown former church included completion of the second half of the transepts, construction of a new vestry, extension of the nave 3 metres (9.8 ft) toward the street, removal of the main doors from the sides to the front, and the addition of an entry porch. Later, two porches with side doors were added to the northern transept.

A larger Sunday school hall, adjacent to the former church and facing Mowbray Terrace, was erected c. 1916, on land acquired in 1904 from church elder Alexander Smith Lang.

Following the First World War an honour board and memorial pulpit were erected in the former church. The building appears to have been re-roofed c. 1927, with fibrous cement tiles similar to those on the hall. The exterior walls were clad and sprayed in 1966.

The leadlight windows at the front of the former church were donated by Alexander Brown Wilson, who as church architect had designed the extensions and both halls. Wilson designed several other Presbyterian buildings in Brisbane, including extensions to the Ann Street Presbyterian Church. Following his father's retirement in 1928, Ronald Martin Wilson was appointed church architect.

The former Mowbraytown Presbyterian Church has played a strong role in the spiritual and social life of East Brisbane. The hall has been the venue not only for church activities, but also for community concerts, ballet and gymnastics classes, meetings and seminars, dances, children's play groups, and polling booths. Both the former church and hall are local landmarks, and have featured prominently in heritage walking tours of East Brisbane organised by the Mowbraytown Residents' Association.

The church was closed in December 1992 and sold in 1995. The former church building was occupied by several businesses, and the organ, pulpit and surrounding church fittings have been preserved. Since April 2009, the building has been occupied by BCA Consultants.

== Description ==
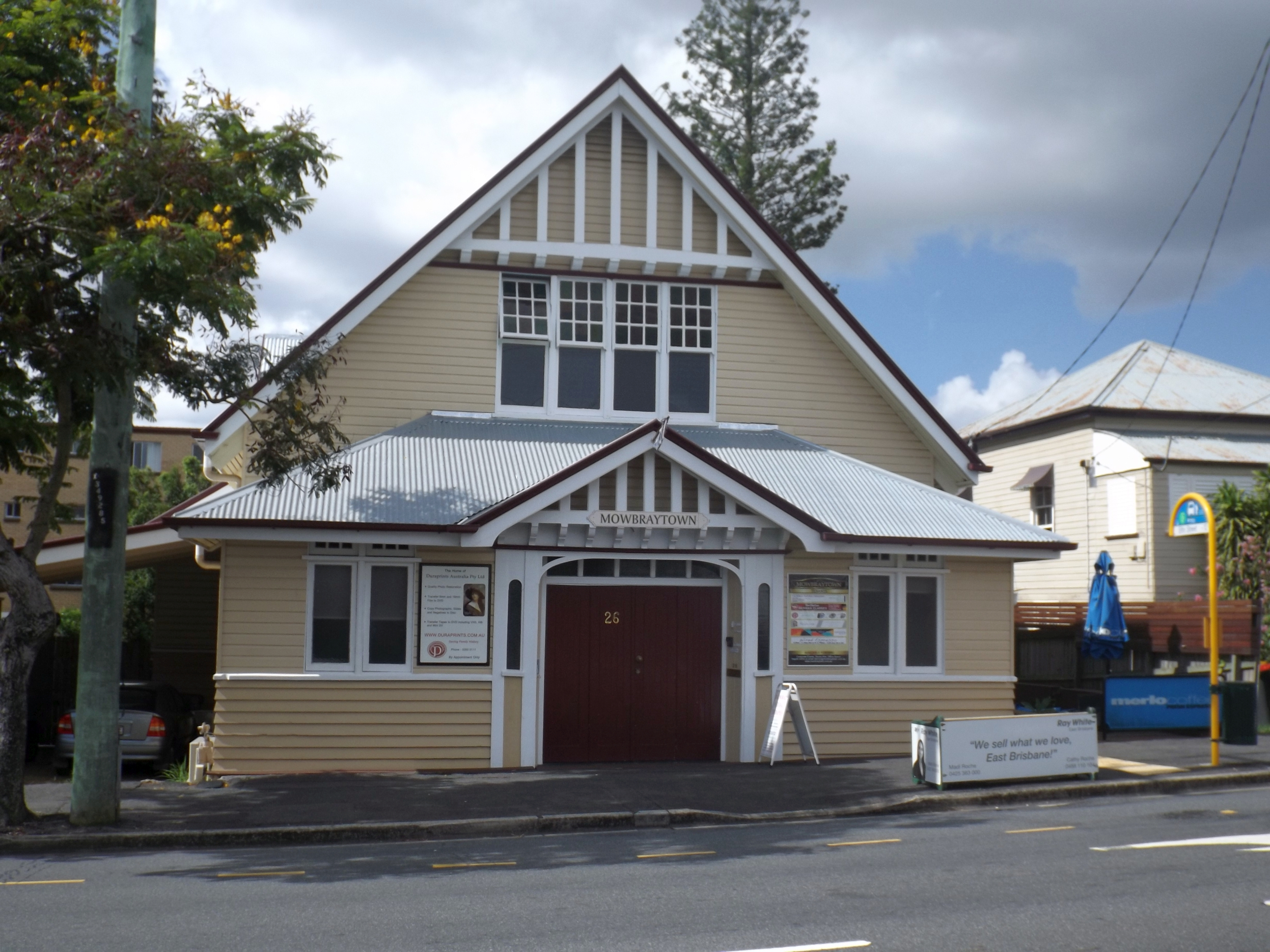
Former church hall, 2015

The former Mowbraytown Presbyterian Church group consists of a former church, with a small kindergarten room attached at the rear, and an adjacent hall to the east, which are located on a level corner site in East Brisbane.

The single-storeyed timber former church, with timber buttresses, has been clad with fibrous cement sheeting and sprayed with a rough finish concrete render. The building has a steep pitched gable roof, a twin gable transept, sprocketed eaves, asbestos cement tiles laid in a diamond pattern and a sheet metal spire surmounted by a cross over the south end of the nave. A small apse extends to the north with a vestry to the west and a store with a corrugated iron roof to the east. A timber kindergarten room, clad in the same material, with a steep pitch gable roof is attached to the north. The building has narrow lancet hopper windows, with leadlight panels to the nave and transept, concrete stumps to the perimeter and a timber and asbestos cement tile hood to the north nave round window.

The south entry, almost to the property boundary, has twin double timber doors with arched fanlights and an asbestos cement tile awning supported by paired timber brackets. The gable above has a triple lancet window with leadlight panels and an arched timber surround, a battened top panel and paired timber brackets.

Internally, the former church has a diagonally boarded raked ceiling with scissor trusses and arched timber braces to the nave. Faceted timber columns and pointed arches separate the double gable transept which internally is divided into four gables. The building has tongue and groove walls above the dado with silky oak panelling below. A large pointed arch opens to the apse, which houses a large pipe organ, with a round leadlight window above, and a pointed arch door to the west opening to the vestry. The church has carved silky oak altar, pulpit, rail and high-backed chairs. The entry is separated from the nave by a timber screen and the timber pews appear original.

The hall is a single-storeyed timber building with a steep pitch gable roof with asbestos cement tiles laid in a diamond pattern, roof vents and terracotta ridges and front finial. The east and west sides have a lower pitch, and the front and rear sections have lower hips. The building has concrete stumps, weatherboard sheeting to balustrade height and chamferboard above, with twin centrally pivoted hopper windows and coloured glass fanlights.

The south entry, at footpath level at the property boundary, has a central gable entry with recessed folding double timber doors with a long narrow fanlight and decorative timber brackets and battens. The higher gable behind has a panel of four sash windows with coloured glass inserts and a timber battened panel above.

Internally, the hall has a diagonally boarded raked ceiling, a flat section with fretwork vents at the collar beam and metal ties to the top plate. The building has a timber floor, tongue and groove walls, raised stage and side partitions with double timber doors either side, and timber posts with arched brackets which separate the side aisles. The central entry has a room to either side, and the rear section has a kitchenette.

The property has a concrete post fence with spherical tops, iron gates and wire balustrade on Mowbray Terrace, and a timber and wire fence on Geelong Street.

== Heritage listing ==
Thee former Mowbraytown Presbyterian Church Group was listed on the Queensland Heritage Register on 22 October 1993 having satisfied the following criteria.

The place is important in demonstrating the evolution or pattern of Queensland's history.

The former Mowbraytown Presbyterian Church is important in demonstrating the pattern of growth of Presbyterianism in Brisbane in the late 19th century.

The place is important in demonstrating the principal characteristics of a particular class of cultural places.

The former Mowbraytown Presbyterian Church Group, including the former church and both halls, is important in demonstrating the principal characteristics of an evolving late 19th/early 20th century suburban church group in Brisbane.

The place is important because of its aesthetic significance.

The former Mowbraytown Presbyterian Church Group is important in exhibiting a range of aesthetic characteristics valued by the Brisbane community and the former church congregation, in particular the contribution of the buildings, in scale and form, to the Mowbray streetscape and East Brisbane townscape, the quality of the former church interior, including the timber joinery, leadlight windows, furnishings, organ, memorials, decorations and inscriptions and the intactness and aesthetically cohesive nature of the group.

The place has a special association with the life or work of a particular person, group or organisation of importance in Queensland's history.

The former Mowbraytown Presbyterian Church Group has a special association with architect AB Wilson, and his contribution to Presbyterian church architecture in Brisbane.
