= Veronica Rueckert =

American author

Veronica Rueckert is an American writer, voice consultant, and former radio host known for her contributions to public radio and literature on communication and empowerment.

== Early life and education ==
Growing up in small towns in Wisconsin, Rueckert often felt distinct due to her Hispanic heritage; she is half Mexican. She pursued higher education at the University of Wisconsin-Madison, where she trained as an opera singer and earned a degree in vocal performance.

== Career ==
Rueckert's career in broadcasting began in 1996 at Wisconsin Public Radio, starting as a weekend announcer. She progressed to producing for the Peabody Award-winning, nationally syndicated program "To the Best of Our Knowledge," where her essays were also featured. Rueckert hosted the afternoon drive-time program "Central Time" starting in 2013.

In 2015, Rueckert established a voice coaching and consulting business, focusing particularly on helping women find their voices. This work led to the publication of her book, Outspoken: Why Women's Voices Get Silenced and How to Set Them Free, in 2019 by HarperCollins. The book was noted by Kirkus Reviews for its unique perspective and practical advice, describing Rueckert's style as "encouraging, supportive, and cheerful."

Post-publication, Rueckert has written articles on women's voices and empowerment for several notable publications, including The Washington Post.
