= East Brisbane =

- Suburb
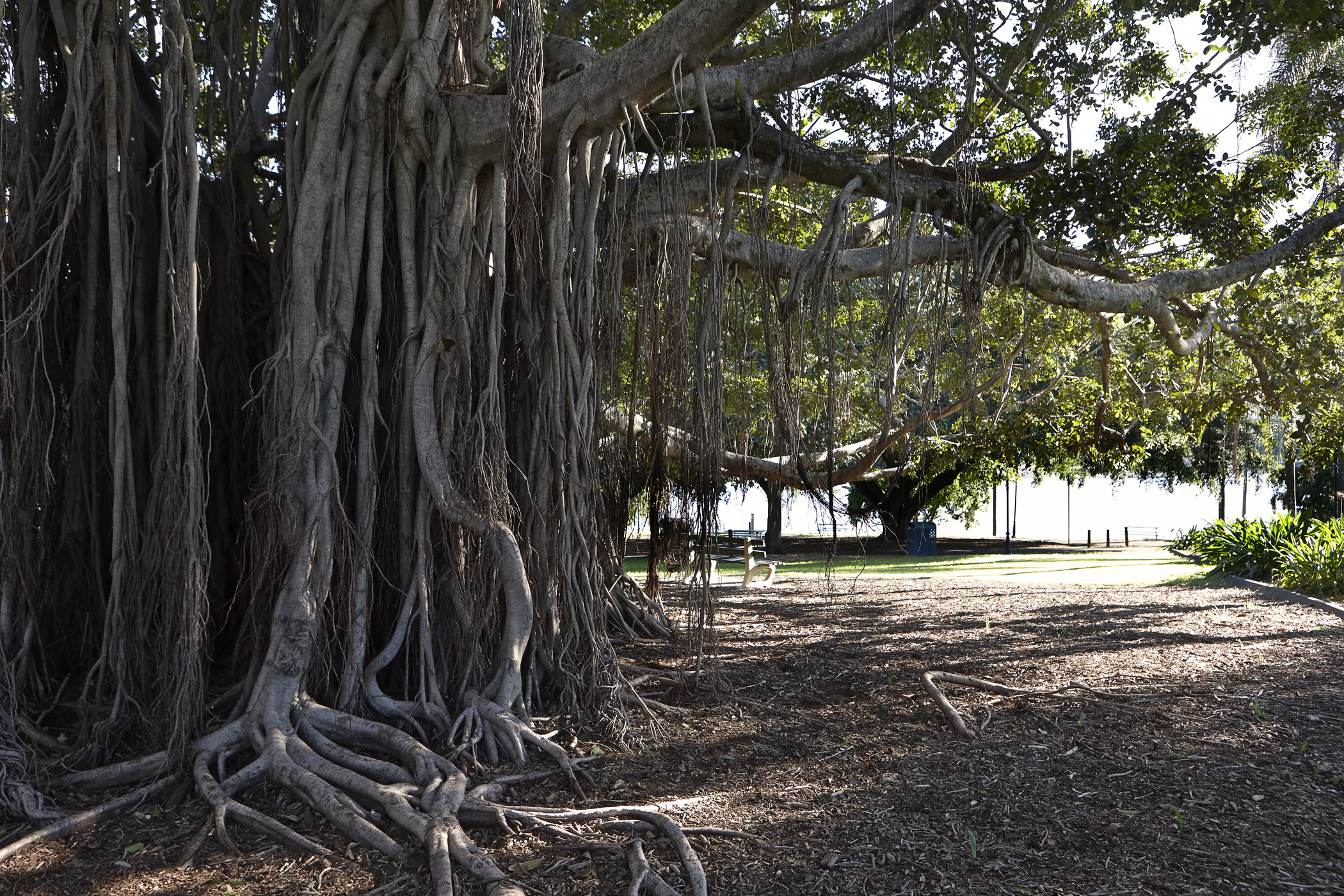
- Mowbray Park in East Brisbane

- Interactive map of East Brisbane
- Coordinates: 27.4830°S 153.0469°E
- Country: Australia
- State: Queensland
- City: Brisbane
- LGA: City of Brisbane (The Gabba Ward)
- Location: 3.6 km (2.2 mi) SSE of Brisbane CBD

Government
  - State electorate: South Brisbane
  - Federal division: Griffith

Area
  - Total: 2.0 km^{2} (0.77 sq mi)

Population
  - Total: 6,186 (2021 census)
  - Density: 3,090/km^{2} (8,010/sq mi)
- Time zone: UTC+10:00 (AEST)
- Postcode: 4169
Suburbs around East Brisbane
Kangaroo Point	New Farm	Norman Park
Kangaroo Point	East Brisbane	Coorparoo
Woolloongabba	Woolloongabba	Coorparoo

East Brisbane is an inner southern suburb of the City of Brisbane, Queensland, Australia. In the 2021 census, East Brisbane had a population of 6,186 people.

== Geography ==
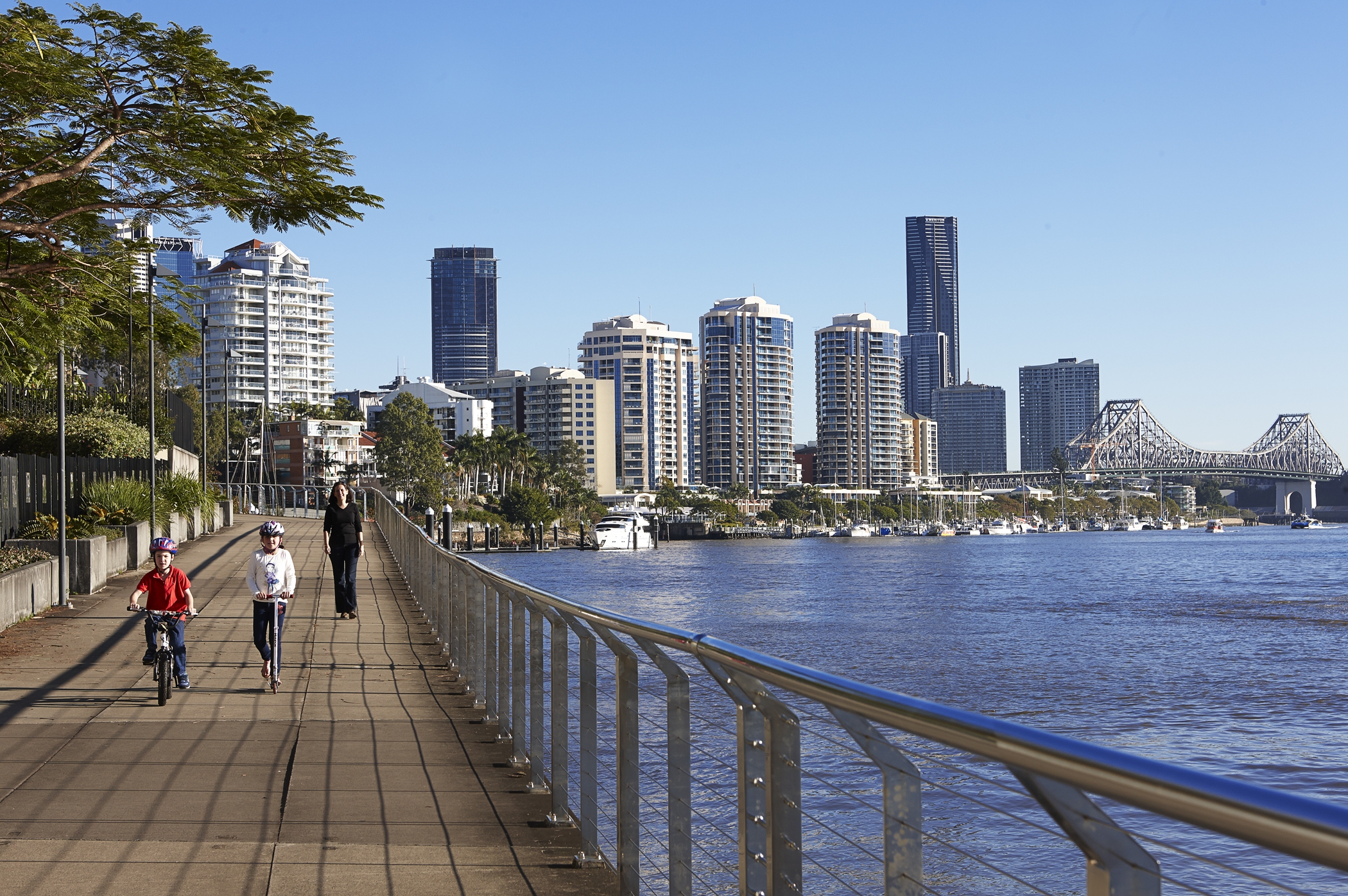
Looking north-west from Mowbray Park in East Brisbane towards Kangaroo Point and the CBD

East Brisbane is located 2.5 kilometres (1.6 mi) south-east of the central business district (CBD). It is mostly residential, with some small commercial areas, and has many original Queenslander houses.

East Brisbane is bounded by the median of the Brisbane River to the north, Norman Park to the east, Coorparoo to the south-east, Woolloongabba to the south-west, and Kangaroo Point to the north-west. The border between Norman Park and most of Coorparoo follows Norman Creek.

Major roads include Lytton Road, Wellington Road, and Latrobe Street in the north, and Vulture Street and Stanley Street in the south of the suburb. The eastern side of the suburb rises to a small hill with some views over Woolloongabba and the CBD and falls away to Norman Creek.

== History ==
In 1851, Reverend Thomas Mowbray became among the first to buy land in East Brisbane. He purchased 13 acres that were later developed into Mowbraytown.

The first bridge was built across the mouth of Norman Creek in 1855. Prior to its completion, residents wanting to access Norman Creek had to detour to Stones Corner to use the bridge.

The significant housing areas in East Brisbane were founded during the Brisbane property boom of the 1880s. For example, one such development was the Heathfield Estate, which was released in 1886.

East Brisbane State School opened on 10 July 1899, following the official opening ceremony on 8 July 1899. The school celebrated its 50th anniversary with a jubilee carnival in November 1949.

In 1881, 232 blocks of land were advertised as Longlands Estate to be auctioned on 26 November 1881 by auctioneer David Love. The estate covers an area now in East Brisbane, including Fisher, Longlands and Norman Street.

In 1886, blocks of land were advertised as East Woolloongabba to be auctioned on 6 November 1886 by Arthur Martin & Co. auctioneers.

Brisbane East State School opened on 10 July 1899. It was later renamed East Brisbane State School.

Langlands Estate, a subdivision of 1289 allotments, was advertised for auction on 13 July 1889 by Dansie & Chandler auctioneers.

Mowbray Park, a large park alongside the Brisbane River, was established in 1904. On 24 January 1920 swimming baths in the Brisbane River was created alongside the park. The baths were closed in August 1940 due to poor water quality because sewage was being pumped into the Brisbane River at Pinkenba downstream but due to the river being tidal it could be carried upstream to East Brisbane.

Church of England Grammar School (informally known as Churchie) opened on 8 February 1912. It was subsequently renamed Anglican Church Grammar School.

St Benedict's Catholic Primary School opened on 20 January 1928 behind St Benedict's Catholic Church at 81 Mowbray Avenue (27.4840°S 153.0459°E). It closed in 1971.

Until 13 April 1969 electric trams operated by the Brisbane City Council served the suburb, running along Stanley Street from Woolloongabba, into Lisburn, Elfin and Latrobe Street and thence into Lytton Road, and on to Bulimba. Trolley-buses, also operated by the City Council operated along Stanley Street until March.

== Demographics ==
In the 2011 census, East Brisbane had a population of 5,598 people.

In the 2016 census, East Brisbane had a population of 5,934 people. Of these 53.0% were male and 47.0% were female. Aboriginal and/or Torres Strait Islander people made up 1.3% of the population. The median age for the suburb is 31 while the most prominent age group is the 20–24-year-olds who make up 12.4 per cent of the suburb. 63.2% of people were born in Australia, compared to the national average of 69.8%. The most common countries of birth were New Zealand 3.6%, England 3.2%, India 1.5%, Brazil 1.3% and China (excludes SARs and Taiwan) 1.0%. 74.3% of people only spoke English at home. Other languages spoken at home included Spanish 1.8%, Mandarin 1.6%, Portuguese 1.2%, Nepali 1.1% and Italian 1.1%.

In the 2021 census, East Brisbane had a population of 6,186 people.

== Landmarks ==
Major landmarks in East Brisbane include Mowbray Park, Heath Park, and Anglican Church Grammar School.

== Heritage listings ==
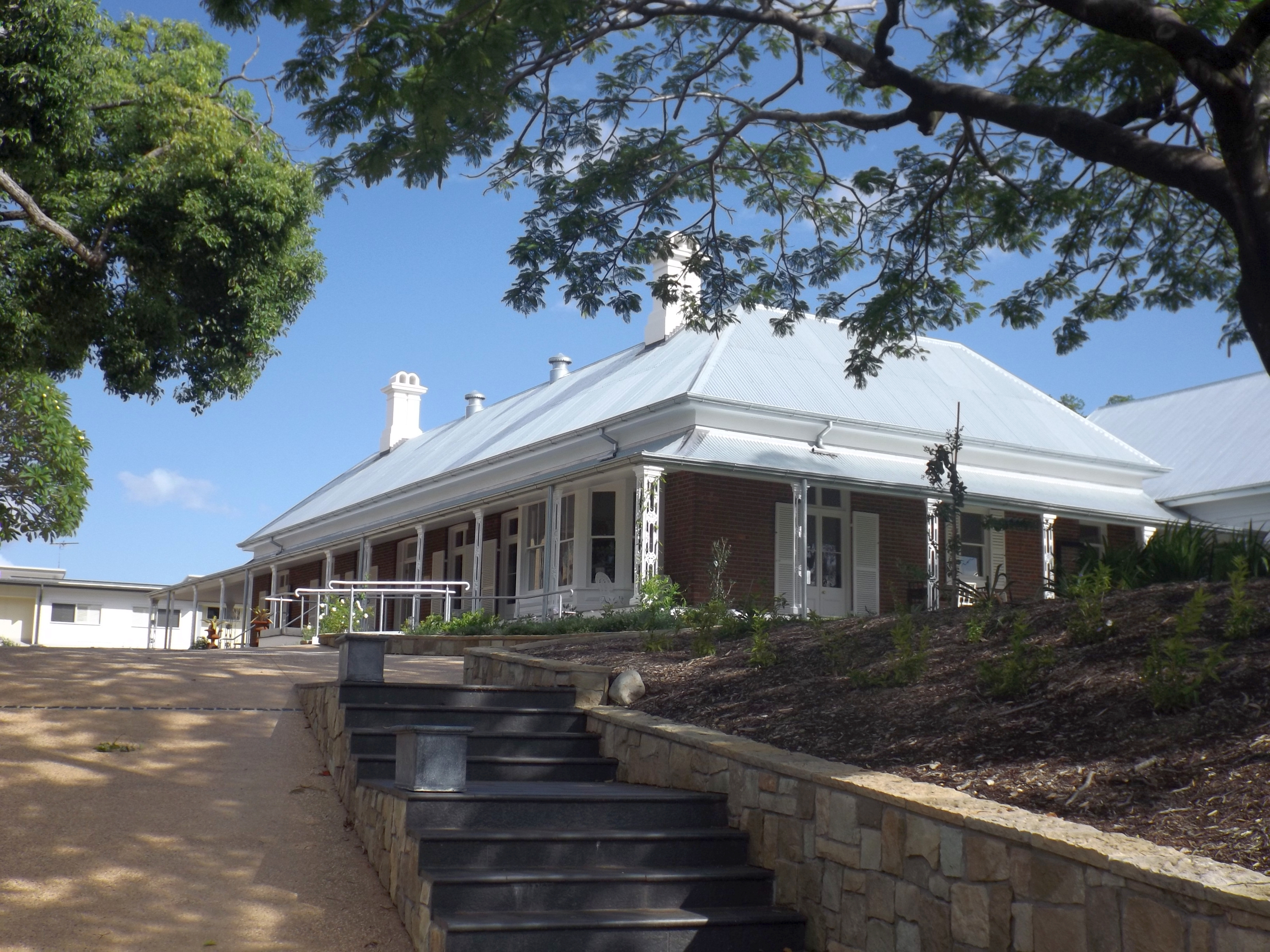
Hanworth, 2015

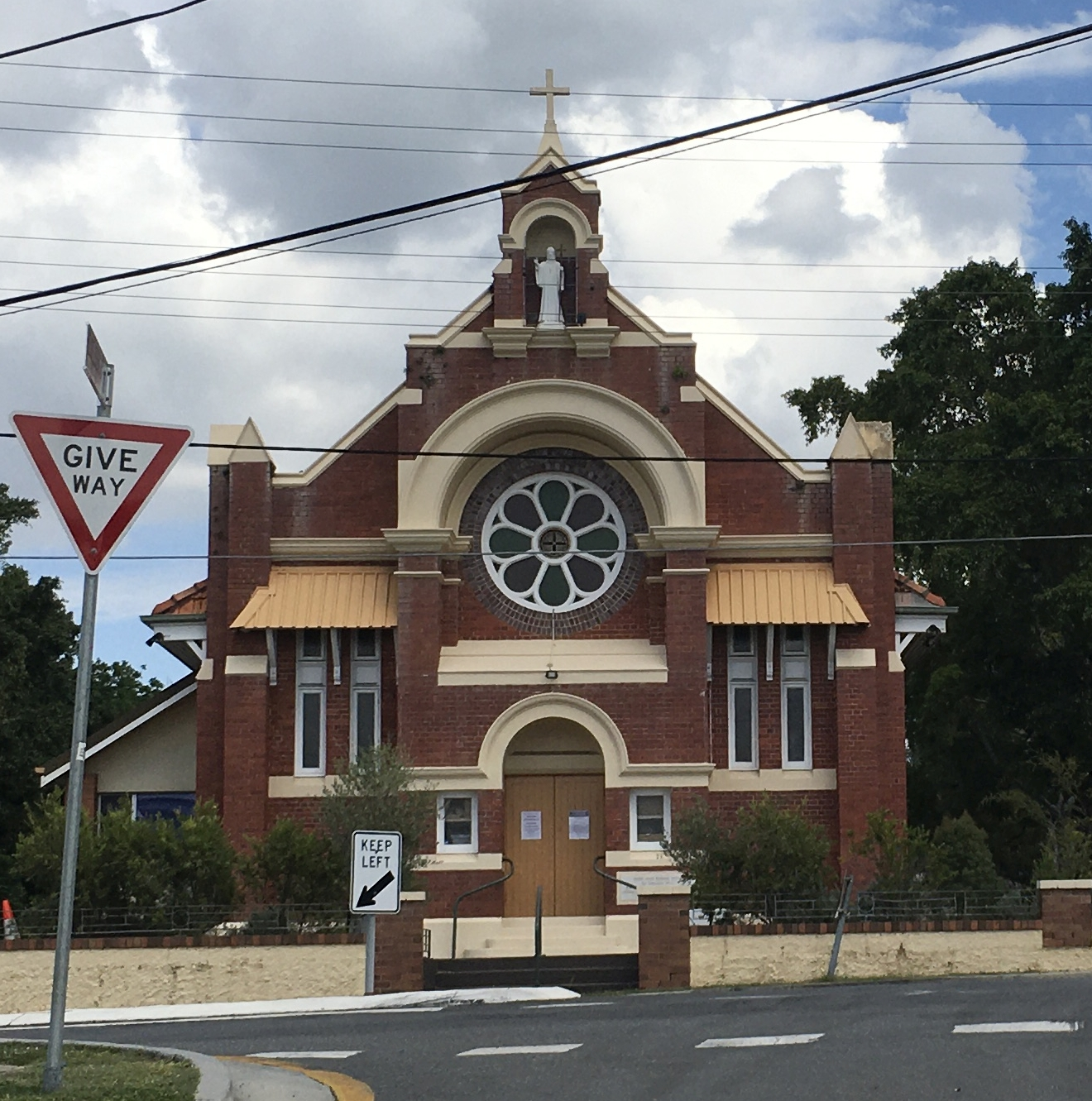
St Benedict's Roman Catholic Church, 2020

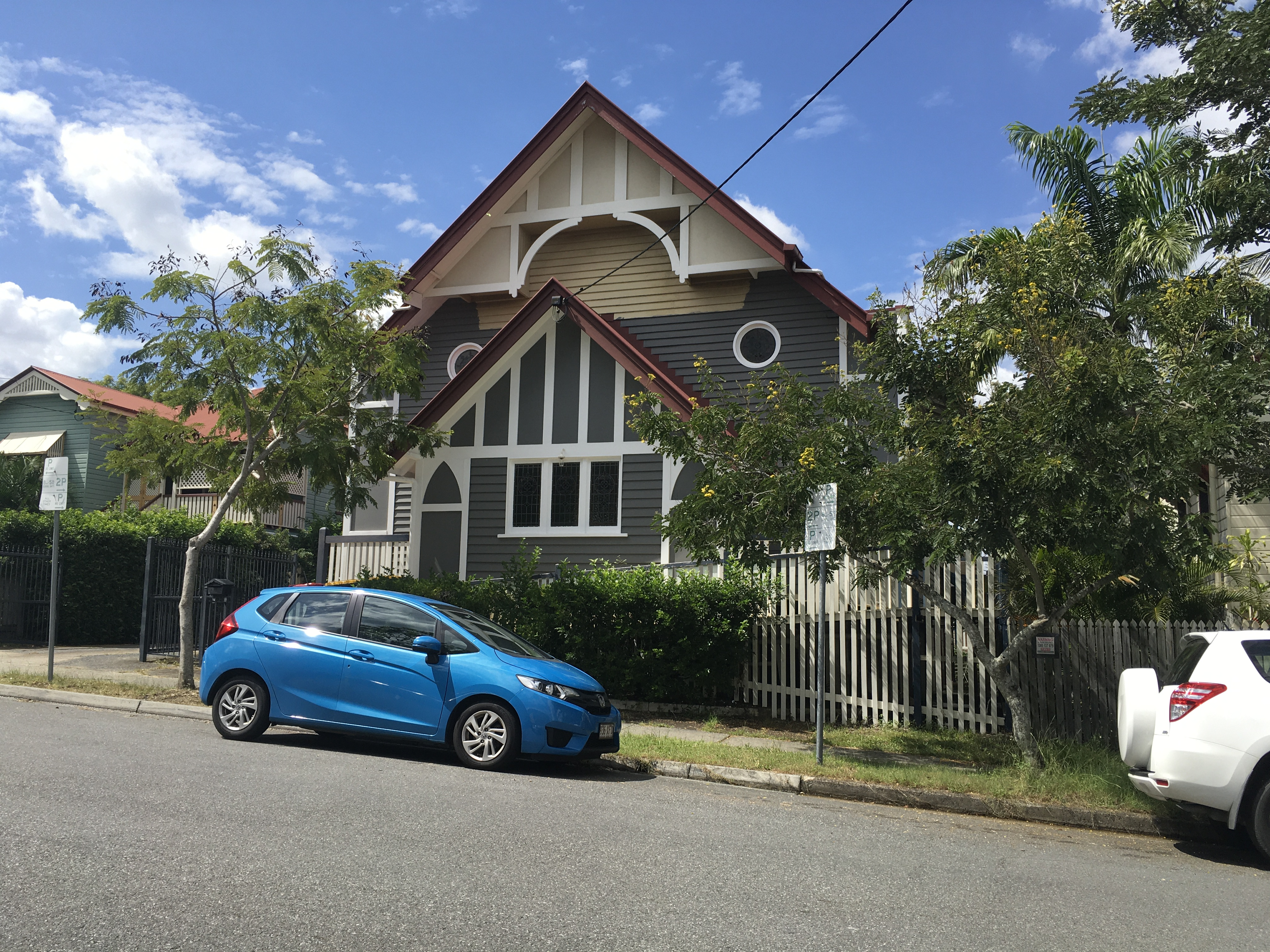
Former East Brisbane Primitive Methodist Church, 2020

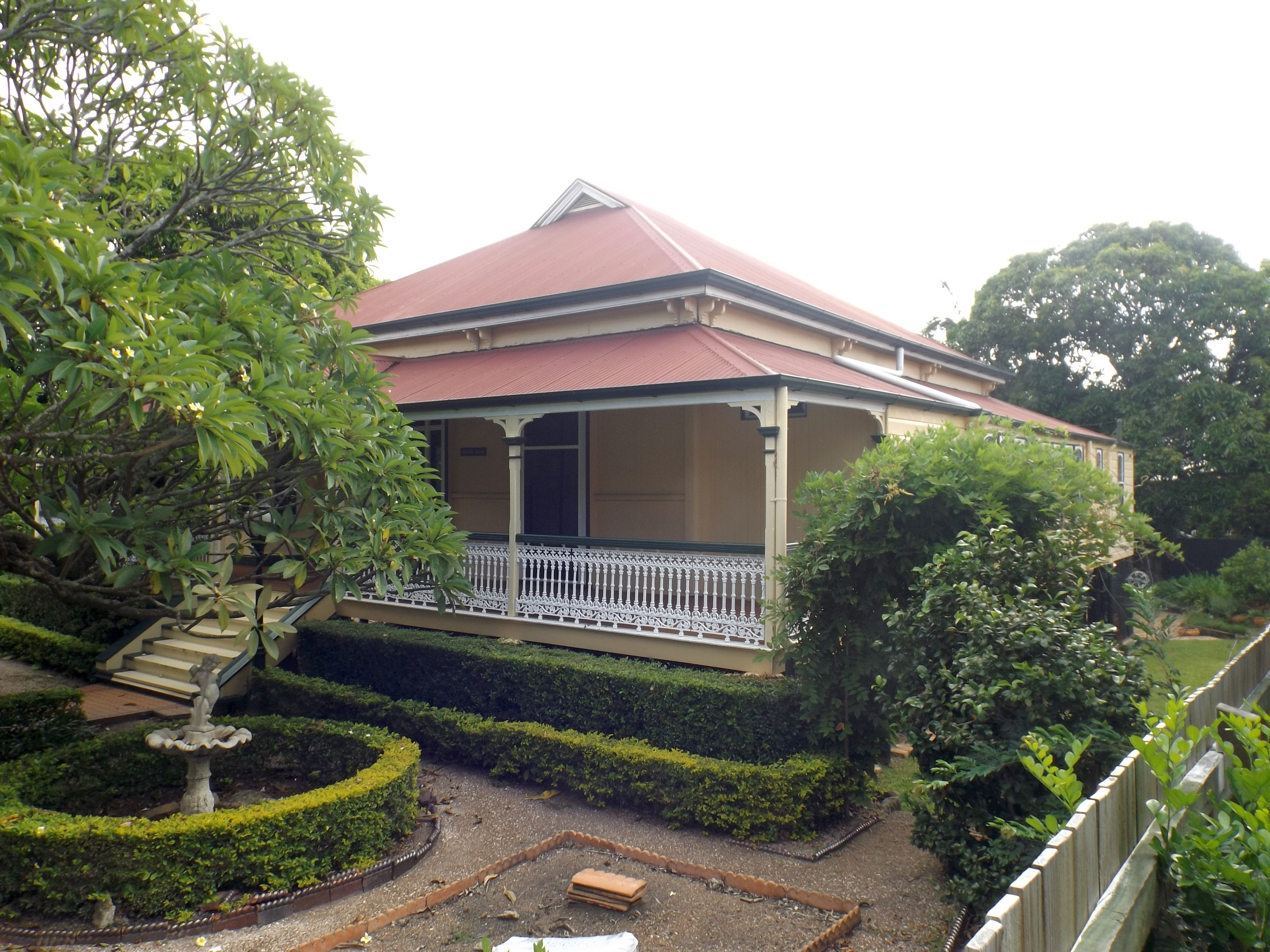
Hester Villa, 2015

East Brisbane has a number of heritage-listed sites, including:

- Kitawah, 59 Heath Street
- Eskgrove, 56 Laidlaw Parade
- La Trobe, 58 Latrobe Street
- Mowbray Park and East Brisbane War Memorial, 33, 60 & 78 Lytton Road
- Hanworth, 109 Lytton Road
- Mowbraytown Presbyterian Church, 22–28 Mowbray Terrace
- St Benedict's Catholic Church, 81 Mowbray Terrace
- former East Brisbane Primitive Methodist Churches, 20 Norman Street
- Hester Villa, 58 Stafford Street
- Classic Cinema / Triumph Cinema, 963 Stanley Street
- St Paul's Anglican Church, 554 Vulture Street East
- East Brisbane State School, 90 Wellington Road

== Education ==
East Brisbane State School is a government primary (Prep–6) school for boys and girls at 56 Wellington Road (27.4864°S 153.0398°E). In 2017, the school had an enrolment of 212 students with 20 teachers (16 full-time equivalent) and 14 non-teaching staff (8 full-time equivalent).

Anglican Church Grammar School is a private primary and secondary (Prep–12) school for boys at Oaklands Parade (27.4816°S 153.0510°E). In 2017, the school had an enrolment of 1792 students with 150 teachers (147 full-time equivalent) and 129 non-teaching staff (93 full-time equivalent).

There are no government secondary schools in East Brisbane. The nearest government secondary school is Coorparoo Secondary College in neighbouring Coorparoo to the east.

== Sport ==
The suburb is home to Eastern Suburbs FC, who play at Heath Park in the Brisbane Premier League.

== Transport ==
Public transport to the suburb is now predominantly provided by regular bus services and frequent CityCat services, which leave from Mowbray Park. The suburb is also an easy walk from the Woolloongabba bus station and the Coorparoo Railway Station.

== Notable people ==
Notable people from or who have lived in East Brisbane include:

- William Baylebridge, a poet and short-story writer
- Johnny Peebles, Australian soccer player and administrator
- Eric Robinson, a politician
- Lydia Tritton, a journalist and public speaker
- Robert J. Walsh, a medical scientist
