= Mowbray Park and East Brisbane War Memorial =

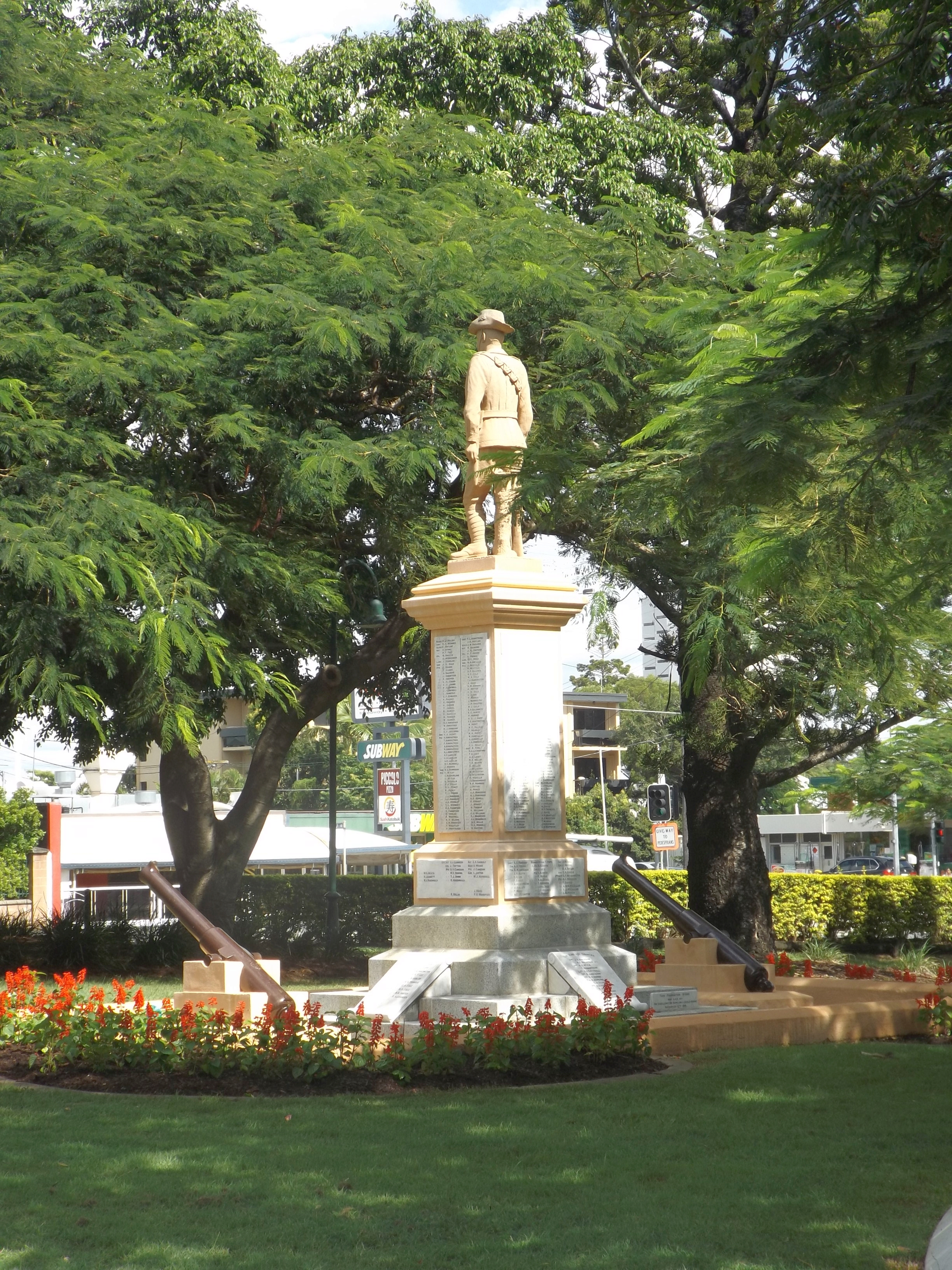
- Memorial in 2015

- Location within Queensland Location within Australia
- 27.4785°S 153.0442°E
- Location: 33, 60 & 78 Lytton Road, East Brisbane, Queensland, Australia

History
- Design period: 1900–1914 (early 20th century)
- Built: 1904–1974

Queensland Heritage Register
- Official name: Mowbray Park and East Brisbane War Memorial, Riversdale
- Type: state heritage (built, landscape)
- Designated: 21 October 1992
- Reference no.: 600189
- Significant period: 1850s–1976 (historical); 1904– (social); 1904–1936 (fabric)
- Significant components: park / green space, lawn/s, gate – entrance, memorial – soldier statue, pathway/walkway, flagpole/flagstaff, swimming pool

Mowbray Park
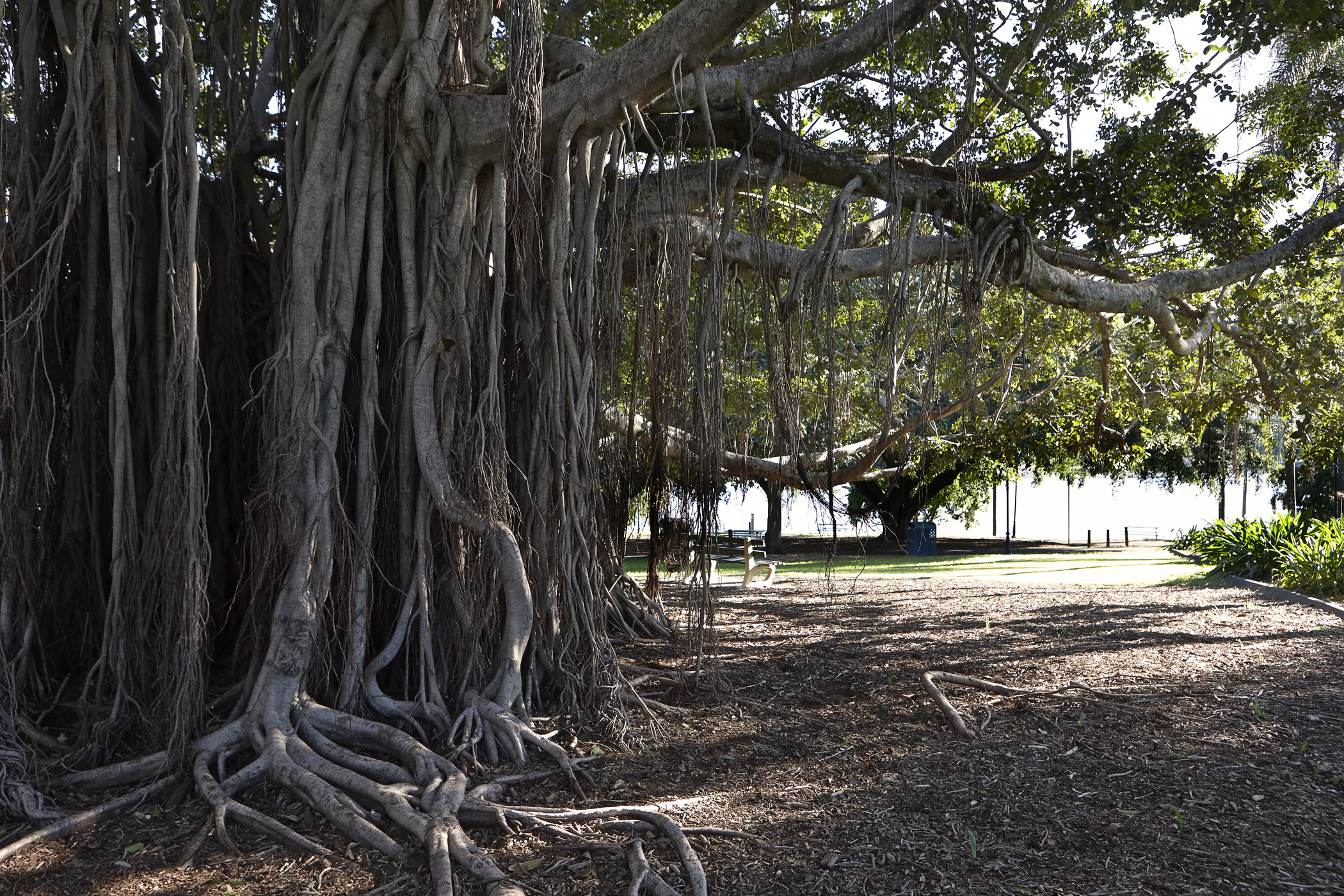
- Mowbray Park in East Brisbane
- Interactive map of Mowbray Park
- Location: Brisbane, Queensland, Australia
- Area: 32,000 m^{2}
- Created: 1904
- Operator: Brisbane City Council
- Designation: State Heritage Place (Queensland Heritage Register)

Mowbray Park and East Brisbane War Memorial are a heritage-listed park and monument within the park on Lytton Road, East Brisbane, Queensland, Australia. It was built from 1904 to 1974. It is also known as East Brisbane War Memorial and Riversdale. It was added to the Queensland Heritage Register on 21 October 1992.

== History ==
In 1903–04, the South Brisbane City Council acquired the riverfront property known as Mowbray's Paddock, alienated by Rev. Thomas Mowbray in the 1850s, for public park purposes. The new reserve was named officially as Mowbray Park in September 1904.

Rev. Thomas Mowbray had arrived in Moreton Bay in 1847, and although he was never inducted into a charge during his twenty years at Moreton Bay, he was instrumental in establishing the Presbyterian Church in Brisbane in the 1850s. In December 1850, he purchased approximately 12 acres (4.9 ha) of land along the southern bank of the Brisbane River at what was then referred to as Kangaroo Point, downstream from Rev. Robert Creyke's purchase, Ravenscott (later Shafston House), overlooking New Farm. Title was transferred to him in November 1851. In the 1850s, Mowbray built his family home, Riversdale, on this site. Thomas Mowbray died in 1867, but the family retained the property until its sale to the South Brisbane City Council in 1904.

In a report presented to the full Council on 14 December 1903, the advantages of the site for a public park were enumerated:

"Mowbray's property is in every way suitable for a public Park or garden having suitable soil, and undulating land reaching to the water's edge, and in addition it will also provide the necessary accommodation for bowling greens, Tennis Courts, and Croquet lawns. The property has a North Easterly aspect, and has an extended view of two reaches of the river, is above flood level, and is situated on the East Brisbane Tramway route. There is no public park or reserve in this locality, and no other piece of land in the neighbourhood so suitable for this purpose."

Lengthy negotiations between the Council and James Anderson Mowbray, Thomas's son, were undertaken in 1903, with the result that Mowbray offered portions 48–50, parish of South Brisbane, to the Council for £6,000, and assisted in its purchase with a mortgage. The property, which consisted of the present park as well as the adjacent lands between the park and what is now Park Avenue (this included the present bowling club, croquet club, former scout lease and former tennis courts site), was transferred to the South Brisbane City Council in January 1905.

The land was acquired by the City Council at the same time as a site at Highgate Hill, and the initiative for these purchases has been attributed to the Mayor of South Brisbane in 1903, Alderman George Blocksidge, who promoted the expansion of public gardens and parks in the rapidly developing municipality.

In 1904, entrance gates to Mowbray's Paddock were erected, and the old house on the site (Riversdale) was sold for removal for £9. In the same year, the East Brisbane Bowling Club was formed, and the South Brisbane City Council agreed to lease to the club the southwest corner of the reserve, fronting Lytton Road. In 1906, the Council agreed to lease parts of the western end of Mowbray Park to the East Brisbane Croquet Club and to the East Brisbane Tennis Club.

Constant erosion along the riverbank at Mowbray Park prompted the Council to consider construction of a stone retaining wall. At the Council's request, the Engineer for Harbours and Rivers prepared a plan for a random stone wall early in 1904, but this was not implemented immediately. In 1906, the Council proposed that a swimming bath should be included in the construction, and in 1907 a landing stage as well. The Queensland Government agreed to assist in the financing, but construction was delayed while the Council enquired as to the most favourable terms under which this work could be carried out. Finally in August 1907, the Council instructed the Queensland Government to proceed with the retaining wall (not including baths or jetty), and construction had commenced by mid-February 1908.

Late in 1909, the South Brisbane City Council called tenders for the construction of a kiosk and attached cottage in Mowbray Park. On 31 January 1910, the Council accepted the tender of contractor J Finn, with a price of £300, and the kiosk was ready for occupation by 10 May 1910.

In August 1910, a public meeting was held at Woolloongabba to urge the construction of a bandstand in Mowbray Park, and a guarantee of £100 toward cost of construction was promised by those who attended. The South Brisbane City Council agreed to subsidise a bandstand to cost approximately £150, provided the Citizens Committee prepared plans and estimates. These were submitted in September 1910, and the Council called tenders in October. The contract was let to W Reed, with a price of £165, and the new bandstand was opened officially on 8 February 1911.

The need for a landing stage or jetty at Mowbray park was reconsidered in late 1910, and expressions of interest were called from ferry/tug boat companies. The jetty appears to have been constructed by the Council early in 1911.

In the second half of 1914, the South Brisbane City Council set aside part of Mowbray Park as a children's playground, but whether this facility was ever developed is not clear from Council records. The playground is not indicated on the 1922 South Brisbane City Council Sewerage Detail Plan of the area, nor on a 1949 contour survey of the park.

In 1916–17, the earliest First World War Memorial in Brisbane, an honour roll and statue honouring all soldiers, sailors and nurses who had enlisted for active service from the 8C (East Brisbane and Kangaroo Point) Training Area, was erected at Mowbray Park by local residents. A public subscription was raised by the East Brisbane Cadet Committee, and the tender of £187/10/- from W Batstone & Sons, monumental masons of Annerley Road, was accepted in March 1916. The "digger" statue, a rare Queensland representation of an Australian Light Horseman, was carved by Alfred Batstone. The foundation stone was laid on 4 November 1916, on the brow of the hill near Lytton Road, with views of both the Shafston and Humbug reaches of the Brisbane River, and the memorial was unveiled by Lady Elsie Goold-Adams, wife of Queensland Governor Hamilton Goold-Adams, on 11 August 1917. It was flanked by two cannons, reputedly part of Thursday Island's 19th century defences, and was surrounded by a garden in the shape of a cross. Additional honour rolls were added during and after the war. A metal railing fence around the memorial had been constructed by 1925, but this was replaced with stone kerbing in 1929, with stone recycled from the old Normal School in Adelaide Street, which was being demolished to make way for Brisbane's Anzac Square.

The question of providing swimming baths at Mowbray Park was raised with the South Brisbane City Council several times during the 1910s, both by public committees and individual aldermen, but little was achieved until the end of the decade. Throughout 1918, Alderman RE Burton agitated for the establishment of a bathing enclosure at Mowbray Park; the matter was referred to the Council's finance committee, and the motion to erect a swimming enclosure on the Brisbane River at Mowbray Park was finally adopted on 20 January 1919. Plans were prepared by the City Engineer by March, and the enclosure was completed in late 1919/early 1920. A Mowbray Park Swimming Club was established even before the baths were opened, and the baths proved popular for summer carnivals and general recreation.

When the kiosk lease came up for renewal in 1920, the Council decided to seek a married couple as lessees, with the wife to take the lease of the refreshment kiosk and residence, and the husband to be appointed as caretaker to the swimming baths and park. The first lease under this arrangement was taken up in October 1920. Once the caretaker was appointed, the Council arranged for the proper management of the baths: separate bathing hours for males and females were prescribed, the land side of the baths was enclosed with wire fencing, and admission prices were established. Changing rooms had been constructed by mid-1922.

With the establishment of Greater Brisbane in August 1925, control and ownership of Mowbray Park was transferred to the new Greater Brisbane City Council.

The park was a popular venue for sailing regattas in the 1920s and 1930s. In April 1936 the Church of England Grammar School applied to the Brisbane City Council for permission to erect a boat house on the river bank at Mowbray Park, near Laidlaw Parade, for use by the school's rowing club. With the application was submitted a plan for a hardwood structure with tiled roof, in dimension 70 feet (21 m) long by 28 feet (8.5 m) wide and 12 feet (3.7 m) high. The application was approved, and the school was granted a lease over the boat house site. The building, which is still owned by the school, was extended at a later date, and is now known as the Elder Hunter Boat House. It remains one of the oldest surviving rowing boat houses along the Brisbane River.

Mowbray Park is understood to have been the site of a "tent city" for homeless families in the early 1930s, during the Great Depression.

In mid-1945, the Brisbane City Council was preparing a final design and layout for Mowbray Park. A 1949 contour plan of the park indicates that much of its mid-20th century layout has been retained.

In 1974 the First World War Memorial was moved to its present position to allow for extensions to the East Brisbane Bowling Club. About 1976, the 1910 kiosk/caretaker's cottage was demolished. The bandstand may have been demolished at this time also. The swimming enclosure was removed at an earlier period, but the stone retaining walls and steps associated with the baths remain, and have been included in this entry in the Heritage Register. The section of Mowbray Park formerly occupied by the tennis courts and scouts' den, (which have been removed), together with the bowls club and croquet club leases, has not been included in the entry in the Heritage Register.

In 1996, Brisbane City Council introduced the CityCat catamaran ferries that operated along the Brisbane River. One of the ferry wharves was established beside Mowbray Park and is known as the Mowbray Park ferry wharf.

During Stage 1 (2018–2020) of the Wynnum Road corridor upgrade, 11 trees along Lytton Rd were relocated, a further 10 removed and several palm and fig trees were relocated within the Park or to other parks to make way for the widened road. Up-lighting was installed under feature trees and the war memorial and free Wi-Fi provided.

== Description ==
Mowbray Park comprises 3.2 hectares (7.9 acres) of treed paths and lawns on a site which slopes gently down to the edge of the Brisbane River from Lytton Road. Remains of former swimming baths are situated in the north-western corner of the park, and a boat house is located in the north-eastern corner. The park also contains a finely crafted First World War Memorial.

The site contains a range of mature plantings and is traversed by a number of paths which meet in the centre of the park. These include: a central Palm-lined path which leads from Lytton Rd to the river; another Palm-lined path which crosses the south-eastern sector of the park; a diagonal path across the north-west sector which passes a remnant stand of eucalypts including Moreton Bay Ash, Grey Iron Bark and Forest Red Gum; a riverside path lined with a range of ornamental trees including Bauhinias and Jacarandas and a row of Palms; and a higher, parallel path which is lined with Fig trees. In addition the park contains other clusters of mature trees, some of which appear to have lined paths which no longer exist. These include: clusters of large Figs in the south-east and south western corners of the park; a grove of Eucalypts and Pines in the south-eastern sector, and a grove of large Fig trees in the north-eastern sector.

The former swimming baths comprise two porphyry retaining walls which are cut into the river's edge and form a shallow C shape. The lower retaining wall along the water's edge is approximately 100 metres (330 ft) long, and has two sets of porphyry steps which lead directly into the water. The upper wall retains the escarpment, and is approximately 70 metres (230 ft) long. Timber pylons where boats are now moored define the boundary of the baths.

The boat house is a large, modestly detailed, single-storeyed timber shed with a gabled terracotta tiled roof and a skillion to the rear. It is clad with chamferboard and vertically-jointed timber, and has exposed framing internally. The roof is supported on a chiaroscuro of timber rafters with names and dates painted on them. A timber boat ramp is associated with the shed.

The War Memorial is located to the east on the central path at the Lytton Rd end of the park. It comprises a statue on a tall pedestal flanked by two cannons. The statue is a life-size Helidon sandstone rendition of an Australian Light Horseman, with a rifle pointing upwards. The pedestal is painted sandstone, and has four large marble plaques attached with five hundred and twenty names inscribed in lead. The Melbourne granite base has four steps, and has four scroll-shaped marble plaques inscribed with an additional one hundred and ninety-six names, and three smaller plaques which commemorate the laying of the foundation stone and the unveiling. The pedestal is set centrally in a concrete base and kerbing. The cannons are also set into the base; they comprise 9-pound (4.1 kg) rifled muzzle loader steel cannons, which bear the Royal monogram of Queen Victoria. Both cannons have inscribed marble plaques. A tall flagpole is located immediately to the south-east of the memorial.

== Heritage listing ==
Mowbray Park and East Brisbane War Memorial were listed on the Queensland Heritage Register on 21 October 1992 having satisfied the following criteria.

The place is important in demonstrating the evolution or pattern of Queensland's history.

Mowbray Park is significant for its close association with the development of East Brisbane, both in its early connection with the Mowbray family and their substantial land holdings in the suburb, and as an initiative of the former South Brisbane City Council in preserving urban public open space during a population and housing boom.

In a broader context, the stone retaining wall and steps are an important illustration of the evolution of recreational activity along the Brisbane River.

Mowbray Park, like Newstead Park, survives as important evidence of the riverine estates which lined much of the Brisbane River in the mid-19th century.

The memorial has cultural heritage significance as evidence of a widespread social movement expressing Australian patriotism and nationalism of the period, and belongs to a class of commemorative structures erected as a record of the local impact of a major historical event and intended to endure.

The place demonstrates rare, uncommon or endangered aspects of Queensland's cultural heritage.

Mowbray Park, like Newstead Park, survives as important evidence of the riverine estates which lined much of the Brisbane River in the mid-19th century. Adjacent properties such as Shafston and Eskgrove, and Bulimba further downstream, did not survive the 19th century. Mowbray Park is one of comparatively few inner Brisbane parks which provides substantial open space with river views.

The East Brisbane War Memorial in Mowbray Park is significant for its aesthetic quality and craftsmanship, the rarity of the Australian Light Horseman statue in a Queensland war memorial, and as evidence of the work of established monumental masons W Batstone & Sons.

The East Brisbane War Memorial is important also as a unique source of historical information.

The place is important in demonstrating the principal characteristics of a particular class of cultural places.

Mowbray Park, like Newstead Park, survives as important evidence of the riverine estates which lined much of the Brisbane River in the mid-19th century. Adjacent properties such as Shafston and Eskgrove, and Bulimba further downstream, did not survive the 19th century. Mowbray Park is one of comparatively few inner Brisbane parks which provides substantial open space with river views.

The place is important because of its aesthetic significance.

Mowbray Park is one of comparatively few inner Brisbane parks which provides substantial open space with river views.

Mowbray Park is a richly planted picturesque enclave which contributes to the local townscape, and contains a finely crafted War Memorial. The park contains early plantings and remnant structures which evidence its evolution and earlier use patterns.

The East Brisbane War Memorial in Mowbray Park is significant for its aesthetic quality and craftsmanship, the rarity of the Australian Light Horseman statue in a Queensland war memorial, and as evidence of the work of established monumental masons W Batstone & Sons.

The place has a strong or special association with a particular community or cultural group for social, cultural or spiritual reasons.

It has been the focus of local community recreational and memorial activity for over 90 years.

The boat house, and the retaining wall and steps associated with the former baths, are evidence of the park's riverside community recreation role.

The place has a special association with the life or work of a particular person, group or organisation of importance in Queensland's history.

Mowbray Park is significant for its close association with the development of East Brisbane, both in its early connection with the Mowbray family and their substantial land holdings in the suburb, and as an initiative of the former South Brisbane City Council in preserving urban public open space during a population and housing boom.

The East Brisbane War Memorial in Mowbray Park is significant for its aesthetic quality and craftsmanship, the rarity of the Australian Light Horseman statue in a Queensland war memorial, and as evidence of the work of established monumental masons W Batstone & Sons.
